The assassination of José Calvo Sotelo took place in Madrid, Spain, in the early morning of Monday, July 13, 1936, during the Second Spanish Republic, when a group of Assault Guards and members of the socialist militias led by a captain of the Civil Guard in civilian clothes showed up at the home of the monarchist leader José Calvo Sotelo with the pretext of taking him to the General Directorate of Security (Spanish: Dirección General de Seguridad, DGS) and, on the way, the socialist Luis Cuenca Estevas shot him twice in the back of the head, and then took his body to the morgue of the Almudena Cemetery. The crime was a reprisal for the assassination a few hours earlier of Lieutenant Castillo of the Assault Guard, well known for his commitment to the Socialists, whose militia he trained. Calvo Sotelo was the most important victim —and practically the last before the civil war— of the wave of political violence that broke out in Spain after the triumph of the Popular Front in the February 1936 elections which caused 384 deaths between February and July (111 deaths were caused by leftists, 122 by rightists —half by Falangists: 61— and 84 by the forces of law and order).

The news of the assassination of Calvo Sotelo caused an enormous commotion, not only because of the event itself —he was the most prominent leader of the opposition—, but also because the perpetrators of the assassination were members of the security forces who had Socialist militants as assistants —one of them, Indalecio Prieto's bodyguard— and as chief the Civil Guard Captain Condés, also linked to the PSOE. But what probably caused an even greater impact was the lack of response from the government of the Popular Front presided over by Santiago Casares Quiroga and the President of the Republic, Manuel Azaña.

On the other hand, the assassination of Calvo Sotelo and its circumstances led many military men, who were still hesitant or indifferent, to join the conspiracy against the government that had been brewing since April under the leadership of General Mola which, only four days after the assassination of the monarchist leader, would lead to the coup d'état of July 1936, whose partial failure triggered the Spanish Civil War. The victors in the war proclaimed Calvo Sotelo as the "protomartyr" of their "Liberation Crusade". Monuments were erected in his honor (the most important one, located in Madrid's Plaza de Castilla, was personally inaugurated by Generalissimo Franco in 1960) and in practically all Spanish cities, a street or a square was dedicated to him. A state-owned INI company founded in 1942 was named after him.

The socialist Julián Zugazagoitia, in the immediate post-war period, wrote the following:

Background 
José Calvo Sotelo was a leader of the anti-Republican Right wing, especially after the defeat of the "possibilist policy of Gil-Robles" in the elections of February 1936, which "paradoxically meant the endorsement of the theses of Calvo Sotelo, who had pointed out the sterility" of the policy. His anti-democratic ideology was manifested on numerous occasions. In the campaign for the general elections of November 1933 he made it clear that he intended to overthrow the Parliament due to its "irremissible and sterile decrepitude", and promised that the one that would emerge from the elections "will be the last one with universal suffrage for many years". He repeated the same promise during the campaign for the following elections, those of February 1936: "We must try at all costs to make these elections the last ones". "I do not believe that when a people, like Spain now, is diluted in the detritus of ignominy and suffers the ulceration of the worst ferments, the appeal to inorganic suffrage, so full in its entrails of errors and imperfections, can be an effective formula to heal, purify and vivify it. [...] Peoples that every two or three years discuss their existence, their tradition, their fundamental institutions, cannot prosper. They live predestined to destitution", said Calvo Sotelo. As an alternative to the "liberal democratic State", which "cannot solve the Spanish problem", he proposed the implementation of a "corporative and authoritarian State".

The Republican Left deputy Mariano Ansó described Calvo Sotelo as "the most characterized enemy of the regime". The then editor of the monarchist newspaper ABC, Luis de Galinsoga, recalled twenty-four years after his assassination in an article "his unwavering determination to go to the last consequence of his combativeness against the Republic; which he had abhorred from its very origin and with which he never compromised, not even at the moments when the Republic seemed to dress up in sheep's clothing". Indeed, from the very day of the proclamation of the Second Spanish Republic, Calvo Sotelo actively participated in the coup conspiracy of 1936 that would lead to the coup d'état of July 1936. He frequently invoked the intervention of the Army to put an end to the "anarchy" brought about by the Popular Front Government and was informed of the plans of the uprising led by General Mola —he even offered himself to the latter as another combatant under the orders of the Army—.

Many of the civilian elements who encouraged and supported the coup conspiracy, especially the monarchists, were convinced that Calvo Sotelo would be one of the top leaders of the regime which would be established after the overthrow of the Republic. This was the belief of Pedro Sainz Rodríguez, one of the monarchists most committed to the anti-Republican conspiracy. In his memoirs he wrote: "I always thought that the politician who was to carry out the work that would convert the uprising into a legally outlined renovation of the Spanish State was going to be Calvo Sotelo". The same thought was shared by Eduardo Aunós, who like Calvo Sotelo had been a minister in the Dictatorship of Primo de Rivera. When Calvo Sotelo said that he was convinced of the existence of the man "who at the right moment will give the voice of salvation [of Spain]", Aunós answered him: "Yes... but you will be at his side, lending him the help of your great intelligence and your fervent enthusiasm".

Calvo Sotelo's interventions in the Cortes (Spanish Parliament), like those of the CEDA leader José María Gil-Robles, were always the object of "contemptuous aversion" and "extreme aggressiveness" on the part of the majority of the Popular Front deputies. The speech he made on April 15, in which he listed in detail the hundreds of violent acts that had taken place in Spain since the elections (according to Calvo Sotelo there had been 74 dead and 345 wounded, and 106 religious buildings had been set on fire, one of them the church of San Luis Obispo "two hundred steps from the Ministry of the Interior"), was interrupted several times by the left wing deputies. Some accused him of being behind the Falangist attacks: "You are the employers of the gunmen", "How much did you have to pay the assassins?" Others reminded him of the repression suffered by the revolutionaries of Asturias. The Communist Dolores Ibárruri "La Pasionaria" told him: "Go and say those things in Asturias", while the Socialist Margarita Nelken shouted at him: "We are going to bring here all those who have been rendered useless in Asturias". And when Calvo Sotelo said that "the [violent] rampage lasts weeks and months", she shouted back: "And long will it last!"

In the sessions of the following weeks the attacks continued. In the May 6 session Margarita Nelken interrupted him again saying: "the executioners have no right to speak". In the session of May 19, the Socialist deputy Bruno Alonso González challenged Calvo Sotelo to go out into the street to settle accounts after the latter had said to him "Your Honor is a little thing, a pygmy", in response to an interruption by Alonso González in which he had said to him: "We already know what Your Honor is; but he does not have the courage to declare it publicly" (Calvo Sotelo had just said: "I am interested in putting on record this evident conformity of mine with fascism in the economic aspect, and as for what I could say in the political aspect, I keep quiet for the reason I have previously indicated to Mr. Casares Quiroga...", who had just declared "against fascism the Government is belligerent"). "Your Honor is a pimp!" Alonso González had replied to Calvo Sotelo when the latter called him a "pygmy". The president of the Cortes finally managed to restore order —Alonso González was invited to leave the Chamber— and Calvo Sotelo continued with his speech.

In the Cortes session of June 16, "perhaps the most dramatic" and "the most quoted in the history of the Republic", Calvo Sotelo also intervened to say, amidst frequent interruptions and shouts, that in Spain there was "disorder, pillage, plunder, looting, destruction everywhere" and to defend once again the establishment of an authoritarian and corporative State and to proclaim himself a Fascist: "Many call this State a Fascist State, because if that is the Fascist State, I, who participate in the idea of that State, I who believe in it, declare myself a Fascist". A deputy exclaims: "What a novelty!". Calvo Sotelo then made a call for the intervention of the Army ("the military man would also be crazy who at the head of his destiny would not be ready to rise up in favor of Spain and against anarchy, if it were to occur", said Calvo Sotelo), which provoked the protests of the left wing deputies and the angry reaction of the President of the Government Santiago Casares Quiroga who made him responsible for future coup attempts, a responsibility which Calvo Sotelo accepted (Casares Quiroga said: "It is lawful for me to say that after what Your Honor has done today before Parliament, of any case [in Spanish, he said "caso" (case) not "cosa" (thing), as the Francoist historiography would transcribe] that might occur, which will not occur, I will hold Your Honor responsible"; to which Calvo Sotelo replied: "I have, Mr. Casares Quiroga, broad shoulders. Your Honor is an easy man and quick to make challenging gestures and threatening words. [...] I consider myself notified of Your Honor's threat. [...] It is preferable to die with glory than to live with vilification"; he then compared him to the Russian Kerenski and the Hungarian Karoly).

On July 1, what was to be the last plenary session of the Cortes before the civil war was held and which proved to be the most conflictive. There was frequent shouting, interruptions and incidents. The most serious moment took place when, after Calvo Sotelo's intervention, which was interrupted, as was customary, on numerous occasions, the Socialist deputy Ángel Galarza, a member of the Socialist caballerist party, made a threat to the monarchist leader which was not at all veiled. After vehemently protesting that in the Cortes one could make apologies for fascism, as, in his opinion, Calvo Sotelo had just done —he had said, for example, that "political parties are chlorotic confraternities of congressmen" and that the solution to the problems "will be found in a corporate State"—, he said that against Calvo Sotelo "I find everything justified, even personal attacks" (these words were not recorded in the Journal of Sessions by order of the President of the Chamber, but they were picked up by some newspapers). A journalist present in the Chamber transcribed Galarza's intervention as follows:

Galarza's speech was applauded by his party colleagues, but the president of the Cortes, Diego Martínez Barrio, visibly indignant, immediately intervened to reply: "Violence, Mr. Galarza, is not legitimate at any time or in any place; but if in any part that illegitimacy goes up a notch, it is here. From here, from the Parliament, violence cannot be advised. The words of Your Honor, as far as that is concerned, will not be recorded in the Journal of Sessions". Galarza replied: "I submit, of course, to the decision of the Presidency, because it is my duty, out of the respect I owe it. Now, those words, which will not appear in the Journal of Sessions, the country will know them, and it will tell us if the violence is legitimate or not".

The historians who defend the thesis of the existence of an agitation campaign by the right wing to "justify" the coup which part of the Army was preparing with its support consider that the interventions in the Cortes by Calvo Sotelo, like those of Gil-Robles, were part of that campaign. According to these historians, the intention of the two leaders of the non-republican right wing was to make the situation of violence in the streets profitable by elaborating an "incendiary" and "catastrophist" discourse, which was disseminated and amplified by the press of the same political persuasion. Eduardo González Calleja has gone so far as to affirm that "the Civil War was declared before in Parliament than in the streets" and that in this task Calvo Sotelo stood out especially, who "from the first moment in the Cortes maintained a frankly provocative attitude". An assessment that is fully shared by José Luis Martín Ramos who highlights the following phrase from Calvo Sotelo's speech: "The cause is not of the Government, the cause is superior. It is of the State. It is that the democratic and parliamentary regime and the Constitution of 1931 have produced an economic disorder and a social disorder". A similar position is held by the historians Julio Aróstegui and Paul Preston.

For his part, the Italian historian Gabriele Ranzato, who does not subscribe to the thesis of the existence of a right wing agitation campaign that "justified" the coup, has pointed to Calvo Sotelo as one of those "responsible for the violence that was tearing the country apart", due to his continuous calls for the intervention of the army, a "solution of force" "desired, favored, plotted and supported by him since the birth of the Republic, of which he had always declared himself an open enemy". "He was and remained to the end a declared enemy of the democracy brought by the Republic. In this anti-democratic militancy Calvo Sotelo was, without doubt, the most outstanding figure and he had followed a cursus honorum capable of attracting great political hostility and intense popular hatred".

The truth is that Calvo Sotelo felt threatened with death. Already in the Cortes session of April 15 he had said that he had "the honor of appearing on the black lists". A few hours after the harsh dialectical confrontation he had with the President of the Government Santiago Casares Quiroga on June 16, Calvo Sotelo visited the editor of the monarchist newspaper ABC Luis de Galinsoga to whom he said: "You will already understand that after what Casares said this afternoon in Congress, my life is pending the slightest street incident, authentic or provoked by themselves, and I would like you, who are at the newspaper until dawn, to warn me immediately of any event of this kind so that I am not caught unawares by reprisals, although I believe that everything will be useless, because I consider myself sentenced to death." On some occasions he slept away from his home. He even became distrustful of the policemen who had been assigned to escort him. His friends and co-religionists also feared that he would be the victim of an attack and at the beginning of July one of them, Joaquín Bau, gave him a Buick automobile as a gift with the purpose of having it armored. On July 10, only three days before his assassination, they had been testing it in the Parque del Buen Retiro.

The one who also felt threatened with death was Assault Guard Lieutenant José del Castillo, well known for his commitment to the Socialists whose militias he trained, especially after the May 8 assassination of Captain Carlos Faraudo by Falangist gunmen. His name appeared on a list, supposedly drawn up by the UME, of Socialist soldiers to be assassinated, Faraudo being the number one target. The second on the list was Lieutenant Castillo. One of the soldiers who also appeared on the list, Artillery Captain Urbano Orad de la Torre, who had been Faraudo's companion in the UMRA, was convinced that the attack had not been the work of the Phalanx, but of the UME, and so, with the approval of his comrades, he sent a document to a member from that clandestine anti-Republican military organization in which he said that "if another similar attack were to take place, we would reply with the same coin, but not in the person of an Army officer, but in that of a politician. For it was the politicians who were responsible for such a state of affairs".

At the funeral of Captain Faraudo, Lieutenant Colonel Julio Mangada, "visibly moved" —he was a close friend of Faraudo's—, declared before the tomb "the need to demand that the Government act more energetically against the fascist and reactionary provocations and if it does not do so we must swear to pay an eye for an eye and a tooth for a tooth". The funeral was also attended by Captain Federico Escofet, who was in Madrid because he had been elected delegate for the election of the President of the Republic, which was to be held the following day, May 10. Next to him a young man told him that it was necessary to avenge the death of Captain Faraudo by taking reprisals against some high leader of the right wing. It was Civil Guard Captain Fernando Condés, who two months later would head the group that assassinated Calvo Sotelo.

Motive and prelude 

On Sunday, July 12, around ten o'clock at night, Lieutenant of the Assault Guard José del Castillo, well known for his commitment to the Socialists, as well as belonging to the UMRA, was assassinated in a central street of Madrid. The identity of the assailants is unknown and, as Luis Romero has pointed out, "much has been said over who killed Castillo", although it is clear that the murder was "perpetrated by the right wing" and that "it was part of a chain of attacks and reprisals". The news of his death caused an enormous commotion among his colleagues at the Pontejos Barracks where he was stationed. Two of the most exalted were Captain Eduardo Cuevas de la Peña, chief of the 6th Company, and Lieutenant Alfonso Barbeta, of the 2nd Company, the same as Castillo's. One of the two —the defamed witnesses— was a man who had been killed in the same way as Castillo. One of the two —witnesses differ— in a defiant gesture threw his cap at the feet of the director general of Security José Alonso Mallol, who had come to the aid center where Castillo had been admitted dead. Mallol did not take any disciplinary action for this insubordination and limited himself to asking for calm. The funeral chapel was set up in the red room of the General Directorate of Security and Castillo's wife, his relatives and officers of the Assault Guard went there. Also present were members of the socialist militias, especially those of "La Motorizada", of which Lieutenant Castillo was an instructor, headed by their chief Enrique Puente and among them were Luis Cuenca, skilled in the handling of the pistol and who on some occasions had acted as escort for the centrist socialist leader Indalecio Prieto, and Santiago Garcés, who had also provided protection services. All of them were shocked by the assassination of Lieutenant Castillo, but especially Luis Cuenca, a personal friend of his.

Around midnight, officers, non-commissioned officers and fellow guardsmen of Castillo gathered at the Pontejos barracks of the Assault Guard, some of them in civilian clothes, such as the guard José del Rey, who had acted as escort for the Socialist deputy Margarita Nelken. Civilians belonging to the socialist militias also attended, especially from "La Motorizada" (Cuenca and Garcés among them), as well as a civil guard captain in civilian clothes. This was Fernando Condés, a close friend of Castillo's (both were instructors of the socialist militias and belonged to the UMRA). In the midst of the indignation, many clamored for revenge for this and other murders committed by right wing gunmen, as had been the case of Captain Faraudo. The most exalted said: "We cannot allow this! We cannot tolerate it any longer! The Government is letting them [the Falangists] murder us and it will do nothing!" As soon as Lieutenant Barbeta returned from the Surgical Team he had Castillo's company formed to tell the guards in very exalted tones that the murder of Lieutenant Castillo must not go unpunished. However, in his statement before the examining magistrate he will say that he gathered them together to calm them down and tell them "to be resigned to what had happened". Barbeta also instructed a corporal he trusted, Emilio Colón Parda, to select eight or ten guards to participate in a very reserved service.

A group of officers of the Assault Guard —among them Captain Antonio Moreno, chief of the 2nd Company— left Pontejos to meet with the Minister of the Interior Juan Moles to whom they demanded in an ill-disciplined manner the immediate punishment of the culprits, whom they considered to have been Phalanx gunmen. They managed to obtain a list with the names and addresses of Phalanx members suspected "of being active in the bands of gunmen" in order to arrest them immediately. In his memoirs Manuel Tagüeña, a member of the socialist militias who also went to the Pontejos barracks, stated that other names were added to the list, provided by Francisco Ordóñez —a socialist militiaman friend of his who had gone with him— who, taking advantage of the removal of a Phalanx headquarters, had taken possession of the files. The historian Stanley G. Payne asserts, without providing any evidence, that the officers of the Assault Guard decided on their own to also add to the list whose detention had been authorized by the Minister of the Interior the names of the main leaders of the right wing such as Antonio Goicoechea, José María Gil-Robles and José Calvo Sotelo, although the latter two enjoyed parliamentary immunity because they were deputies. Castillo's comrades, according to Gabriel Jackson, wanted "to carry out a spectacular revenge" and "without taking into account any political party or program, and without reflecting on the great repercussions of their act, they decided to assassinate an important right wing leader".

Assassination 

After midnight, Lieutenant Alfredo León Lupión is in charge of organizing the departure of the assault guard vans from the Pontejos barracks to arrest the people assigned to each one of them (the Socialist militiaman Manuel Tagüeña participates in the elaboration of the lists of the Falangists to be arrested, who, according to his own account, chose those with the highest quota and those who were listed as workers, since he suspected that they might be professional gunmen). Around half past one, the driver of van number 17, Orencio Bayo Cambronero, is called to perform a service. About ten Assault Guards designated by Lieutenants Alfredo León Lupión and Alfonso Barbeta (only the names of four of them are known: Bienvenido Pérez, Ricardo Cruz Cousillos, Aniceto Castro Piñeira and Esteban Seco), plus four civilian members of the socialist militias (Luis Cuenca and Santiago Garcés, of "La Motorizada", spearhead of the prietist sector; Francisco Ordóñez and Federico Coello García, both staunch caballerists —in fact Coello was the fiancé of a daughter of Largo Caballero—) in addition to the guard José del Rey Hernández who dressed in civilian clothes (Del Rey was well known for his socialist ideas and had been sentenced to six years and a day for his participation in the October Revolution of 1934; after being amnestied he was assigned to the Political Vigilance Service and was escort for the socialist deputy Margarita Nelken). Lieutenant León Lupión informs them all that in command of the van is the officer of the Civil Guard in civilian clothes, Fernando Condés —he had recently been readmitted to the corps and promoted to captain after being amnestied in February from the life sentence for having participated in the October Revolution of 1934 (and who like del Castillo and Faraudo had trained the socialist militias)—. "That an officer of the Civil Guard should take command of one of these vans, represents a patent irregularity, and even more so if that captain is dressed in civilian clothes", affirms Luis Romero. The same affirms Alfonso Bullón de Mendoza: "That the vehicles would be used by civilians and guardsmen was certainly irregular, but even more so was the fact that León Lupión did not have the slightest inconvenience in handing over the command of van number 17 to Captain Condés, who, not being from the Assault Guard, but from the Civil Guard (where he was also awaiting assignment), could not be in charge of such a service". Lieutenant León Lupión recognized many years later that "Condés, in reality, should not have provided such a service".

As for the route taken by the van, there are discrepancies. According to Hugh Thomas or Gabriel Jackson, the group, "without a very clear idea of where to go" (in Thomas' words), went first to the house of a Falangist militant, but the address on the card was false. He then went to the residence of the leader of the Spanish Renovation party, Antonio Goicoechea, who was not at home. Then he went to the house of the leader of the CEDA, José María Gil-Robles, who was summering in Biarritz. Finally it was decided to go to Calvo Sotelo's home, at number 89 Velázquez Street, corner of Maldonado. However, Luis Romero, author of a monograph on the assassination, affirms that the group commanded by Condés went directly to Calvo Sotelo's house. The same affirms Alfonso Bullón de Mendoza, author of a biography of Calvo Sotelo. For his part, Ian Gibson, author of another monograph on the subject, affirms that they first went to the home of José María Gil-Robles and when they did not find him they went to Calvo Sotelo's house. Gibson relies on the testimony of Santiago Garcés to which he gives more value than the testimony of the four guards who were arrested and interrogated by the Francoist judges who said that the van did not make any intermediate stop between the Plaza de Pontejos and Calvo Sotelo's home. There are also discrepancies as to the time they arrived at Velázquez Street. According to Hugh Thomas or Ian Gibson, it was around three o'clock in the morning of Monday the 13th. According to Stanley G. Payne, two o'clock. According to Luis Romero or Alfonso Bullón de Mendoza, around half past two.

In the doorway of the building where Calvo Sotelo's house was located there were two policemen on night guard. Their names were Antonio Oñate Escribano and Andrés Pérez Moler. Both of them allowed the group led by Condés to pass as soon as he showed them his Civil Guard officer's card —another element that convinced them was that they had arrived in an official car—.

In the house at that time were Calvo Sotelo himself, his wife (Enriqueta Grondona), his four children (Conchita, seventeen years old; Enriqueta, fifteen, who was ill with fever; José, twelve years old, and Luis-Emilio, nine), the cook, the maid and the brother of the latter, fifteen years old, who acted as bellboy. Also living there was the French governess who came with the family from Paris when Calvo Sotelo finished his exile. They were all in bed when the group headed by Condés knocked at the door. The maid and the cook came and refused to open the door even though they said they were policemen coming to conduct a search and threatened to break down the door. They decide to wake up Calvo Sotelo who looks out on a balcony to ask the guards who are in the doorway if it is the police who are banging on the door. They answer yes. He also checks that a van belonging to the Assault Guards is parked there. Calvo Sotelo opens the door in bewilderment and some ten or twelve men, some in uniform and others in civilian clothes, burst into the apartment, going through all the rooms and pretending to be carrying out a search. One of them rips off the telephone cord from the office and throws a monarchist flag on the table to the floor. A guard stands next to the other telephone that was in the corridor.

Once the "search" was over, Condés told Calvo Sotelo that they had orders to arrest him and take him to the General Directorate of Security. According to what his daughter Enriqueta told many years later, Calvo Sotelo said in surprise: "Arrested? But why? What about my parliamentary immunity? And the inviolability of my home? I am a Deputy and the Constitution protects me!" He then demanded to be allowed to telephone the General Director of Security, but they did not allow him to do so. He only calms down somewhat when Condés identifies himself as an officer of the Civil Guard. Calvo Sotelo calms his very anxious wife: "Don't worry. If it is true that it is an order from the Government, I will be back in an hour. I am a deputy of the Nation and the Government, as I know, they will not commit any outrage against my immunity". Then he asked his wife to prepare a briefcase with some clothes, a fountain pen and some pages. She begs him not to leave, but she complies. Calvo Sotelo is not even allowed to dress in his bedroom in private. After kissing his four children —only the eldest daughter has woken up— he says goodbye to his wife whom he promises to telephone as soon as he arrives at the DGS, "unless these gentlemen take me away to give me four shots," he tells her. According to Gabriel Jackson, Calvo Sotelo "was a brave and strong man who suspected treason, and who was psychologically prepared to accept martyrdom." According to Ian Gibson, "he was an undoubtedly brave man, who did not easily lose his head... At that time, he must have realized that the search was unlawful, and suspected that he was going to be murdered. But apparently, he did not create a violent scene, perhaps to spare his family the spectacle".

He descends the stairs accompanied by the governess with whom he speaks in French, which infuriates one of the guards who orders him to speak in Spanish. Calvo Sotelo has told him to warn his brothers Luis and Joaquín, but not his father who is suffering from a stomach ulcer that keeps him in bed —according to Ian Gibson, what he told him was to warn his friends and colleagues Andrés Amado and Arturo Salgado Biempica—. He meets the doorman of the estate to whom he says: "They are taking me under arrest. I have not been able to talk on the phone." Upon arriving at the van he is ordered to sit in the third apartment facing the march, between two uniformed guards (one of them Aniceto Castro Piñeira). The bench in front is left unoccupied. Luis Cuenca is in the rear apartment. Captain Condés is seated next to the driver and next to him José del Rey (although he will deny it before the Francoist judges). Van number 17 starts off in the direction of Alcala Street. When it arrives at Ayala Street, Luis Cuenca shoots Calvo Sotelo twice in the back of the head, killing him on the spot. The body collapses on the floor of the van and is wedged between the two seats. Captain Condés does not make any comment nor does he order the truck to stop when he hears the shots, he limits himself to tell the driver to go to the East cemetery. According to one of the guards who was in the truck, when the shots rang out "Condés and José del Rey exchanged glances and smiles of intelligence", which Del Rey denied before the Francoist judges.

As the van approaches Alcalá Street, its occupants see a car that seems to be waiting for them. In it are Assault Lieutenants Alfonso Barbeta, of the 2nd Pontejos Company, and Máximo Moreno, of the Cavalry Group, both close friends of Lieutenant Castillo, along with three other people. They exchange greetings when the van arrives at Alcalá Street and turns left towards Manuel Becerra, the most direct route to the cemetery. "Was this car, occupied by officers, to cover the "operation" in case of any unforeseen event? Or was it the vehicle that had gone to look for Gil-Robles at his house, and when it did not find him, went to check that the kidnapping and death of Calvo Sotelo had been carried out?", Luis Romero asks.

Shortly afterwards the van arrives at the gates of the East cemetery. It is about four o'clock in the morning. Seeing that it was an official vehicle, the two gravediggers on duty, Esteban Fernández Sánchez and Daniel Tejero Cabello, opened the gate for them. Captain Condés tells them that they are bringing an undocumented corpse. They drive the van to the morgue and leave the lifeless body of Calvo Sotelo on the floor next to one of the marble tables. Shortly afterwards the van leaves the cemetery. In 1943 Esteban Fernandez Sanchez reiterated before the Francoist judges of the General Cause (Spanish: General Cause) what he had already declared to the Republican examining magistrate. His testimony ended as follows: "The witness, in spite of the abnormality of what happened, did not suspect the importance of the event, nor that it was the corpse of Mr. Calvo Sotelo; he was surprised by the appearance of the corpse and the strange way of bringing it, supposing that it had been the object of an attack and that for judicial purposes it would be taken directly to the depository of the aforementioned cemetery.

According to Luis Romero, when the van returns to Pontejos Condés, Cuenca, Del Rey and others meet in Major Burillo's office with him, Captain Moreno, head of Lieutenant Castillo's Company, Pontejos lieutenants Alfonso Barbeta and Alfredo León Lupión, and Cavalry Group lieutenant Máximo Moreno. Towards dawn they are joined by Lieutenant Colonel Sanchez Plaza, head of the Madrid Assault Guard. However, Ian Gibson does not mention that this meeting took place and further states that Major Ricardo Burillo was not at the Pontejos Barracks because he was on duty that night at the General Directorate of Security. According to Gibson, giving credibility to Burillo's testimony before the judges of the General Cause, he went to Pontejos around 7:00 a.m. when he learned that the van had left the group he commanded. He went along with Lieutenant Colonel Sanchez Plaza, who "was going to give information about the event that had been ordered by the Minister of the Interior, Juan Moles." Alfonso Bullon de Mendoza also states that Major Burillo was at the DGS and that "around seven o'clock" he went to Pontejos along with Lieutenant Colonel Sanchez Plaza.

On the other hand, Condés ordered the uniformed guards to remain silent and the driver Orencio Bayo to clean up the remains of blood left in the van.

Aftermath

Discovery of Calvo Sotelo's corpse 
Immediately after her husband was taken away, Enriqueta Grondona asks for help from friends and colleagues of Calvo Sotelo's party. For her part, the French governess fulfills the order and warns her brothers. The first to arrive at the house, accompanied by his wife, is Arturo Salgado Biempica, secretary and friend of Calvo Sotelo. Almost an hour has passed and there is still no news, so Enriqueta Grondona decides not to wait any longer and telephones the General Director of Security, Alonso Mallol. He unkindly replied that he knew nothing about Calvo Sotelo's whereabouts and had not given any order to arrest him or search his house. According to Ian Gibson, the first to telephone Alonso Mallol were the two security guards who were guarding the gate and that Calvo Sotelo's wife phoned him a little later. Gibson also states that the first person he spoke to was Commander Ricardo Burillo, the head of the Pontejos Group, who was on duty that night at the General Directorate of Security. Gibson relies on the statement made by Burillo in 1940 before the Francoist judges of the General Cause and on the confession he made to his fellow prisoner Rafael Sánchez Guerra two days before being shot, having been condemned to death for, among other alleged crimes, being directly responsible for the assassination of Calvo Sotelo.

Shortly afterwards, his brothers Luis and Joaquín and prominent members of the Spanish Renovation party arrived at Calvo Sotelo's home. An initial approach to the DGS was made by Arturo Salgado and the deputy Andrés Amado, but they were not received by Alonso Mallol. His secretary merely told them that orders had been given to look for the deputy Calvo Sotelo. Then Calvo Sotelo's brothers, accompanied by Salgado and Amado and by Pedro Sainz Rodríguez, Spanish Renovation deputy for Santander, went to the Ministry of the Interior, whose headquarters were located in Puerta del Sol. It has just dawned. They are received by the Undersecretary Bibiano Fernández Osorio y Tafall, who tells them that in the Ministry there is no record that Calvo Sotelo has been arrested, but at a certain point he adds that traces of blood have been found in a van of the Assault Guards and that they are going to begin to investigate it. According to what Andrés Amado told three years later to the judges of the General Cause they asked that the guards in that van be arrested immediately, but Ossorio replied: "It is not possible, because the forces that were in the van have left to serve in the embassies...". Ian Gibson gives little credibility to this testimony because Amado was determined to prove the complicity of the DGS in the crime of his friend and co-religionist, which on the other hand was also the objective of the Francoist judges.

For his part, the monarchist deputy Fernando Suárez de Tangil, Count of Vallellano, phoned around five in the morning to the house of the president of the Cortes Diego Martínez Barrio to inform him of the possible kidnapping of Calvo Sotelo, but it was his wife who took the message because she did not want to wake him up as she had gone to bed very late after returning from a trip to a farm in Valencia. He then tried to locate Vice President Luis Jiménez de Asúa, but was unsuccessful. According to his memoirs, Suárez de Tangil also called the Director General of Security Alonso Mallol, who hinted that Calvo Sotelo might have been murdered: "I jumped up and had the most violent telephone conversation anyone can imagine. I told him, they had perpetrated an official assassination, Mallol answered me that he would not tolerate that and that he was going to send a truck with guards to arrest me; I answered him that I would not receive them like Calvo; and that was the end of the dialogue. Just in case, I took my boxes of big pistols and my pocket pistol down to my office and continued communicating...".

When Martínez Barrio's wife gave him the news of the kidnapping, he felt dismayed and responsible because he was a deputy. The first person he called was the Count of Vallellano: "count me as one more deputy of your minority, at your unlimited disposal, for communications to the President of the Council and Minister of the Interior, unspeakable parliamentary attack; I will inform you from hour to hour or sooner if necessary, I am not moving from here; 3000 civil guards are going out on all the roads that I know of...". The Count replied: "I don't think that will be of any use, Mr. President, my friend should not be looked for on the roads, but in the Manzanares sewers or similar places, where he has been a corpse for some hours". He then called the Minister of the Interior, Juan Moles, who assured him that the government had nothing to do with the matter. They agree to redouble their efforts to find Calvo Sotelo. Martínez Barrio then writes a note for Casares Quiroga that is taken to the Presidency by the Oficial Mayor of the Congress. The note says: "Having been informed by the deputy Mr. Fernando Suárez de Tangil that the also deputy Mr. José Calvo Sotelo has been arrested early this morning, I am writing to Your Excellency so that you may kindly inform me of what happened and at the same time state that if the arrest has been ordered by a competent authority and had not been in case of in fraganti crime, in accordance with article 56 of the Constitution, he must be immediately released". For his part, the deputy Geminiano Carrascal telephoned the president of his parliamentary group José María Gil-Robles who was in Biarritz to give him the news of the kidnapping of Calvo Sotelo, and the leader of the CEDA replied: "I am leaving for Madrid right now".

Around nine o'clock in the morning the director of the East cemetery decides to communicate to the City Council of Madrid that in the morgue there is an unidentified corpse that a detachment of Assault Guards has taken there at dawn, according to what the two gravediggers who were on duty have informed him. Mayor Pedro Rico, who has received the news that Calvo Sotelo is unaccounted for, orders that the councilors Aurelio Regúlez and Isidro Broceta (or Buceta) go immediately to the cemetery. It would be around eleven o'clock in the morning. The director of the cemetery also informed the General Directorate of Security and Alonso Mallol ordered Commissioner Aparicio to go quickly to the necropolis. The councilmen verify that it is Calvo Sotelo and so they inform Mayor Rico, who in turn calls Alonso Mallol to tell him "with an altered voice" that "the missing person" has been found (he does not pronounce Calvo Sotelo's name). Commissioner Aparicio also confirms this and Alonso Mallol orders that the morgue and the area around the cemetery be cordoned off by the Civil Guard (and not by the Assault Guard to avoid tensions and incidents). Alonso Mallol communicates the news to the government, which at that moment is in session. Without knowing that the body had been found, Calvo Sotelo's brothers arrive at the cemetery, accompanied by Paco Grondona, brother-in-law of the disappeared, and the monarchist deputies Andrés Amado and Pedro Sainz Rodríguez. Shortly afterwards, a multitude of journalists appeared at the cemetery, among them Santos Alcocer, reporter of the Catholic newspaper Ya. Also, prominent members of the right wing also went to the cemetery.

The royalist deputies asked the government that the mortuary chapel be installed in the building of the Cortes or, if this was not possible, in the Academy of Jurisprudence, of which Calvo Sotelo was president. The government denies the permission and it is the president of the Cortes Martínez Barrio who in the evening informs the journalists of the decision, "because it is a dangerous step, since, even if all the precautions that the Government has in its power were taken, there can always be elements interested in disturbing normality". So the mortuary chamber will be installed in the morgue of the East cemetery, the same place where the body was found —it is located about two hundred meters from the mausoleum of the Calvo family—. He also tells the journalists that according to what the President of the Government has informed him in person, the death of Calvo Sotelo was caused by a firearm and not by a knife, as it had been claimed. The Government also decided not to allow the family and friends of the deceased to watch over the body during the night of July 13–14, which further inflamed the mood of the right wing. The lifeless body of Calvo Sotelo would not be exposed to the public until 11 a.m. on Tuesday, July 14, after the autopsy had been performed.

Perpetrators and judicial investigation 
According to the socialist Julián Zugazagoitia, just after the end of the war, Luis Cuenca, the perpetrator of the shots, showed up at his house at eight in the morning, about four hours after the assassination. Zugazagoitia was the director of the official newspaper of the PSOE, El Socialista, and a deputy belonging to the prietist sector. That it was Luis Cuenca is what some historians have deduced (although others have doubted it) because Zugazagoitia in his book did not identify him: "The person at whose request I had been woken up was waiting for me in the office... His face had an expression of weariness on it, the exhaustion of one who has lost the night. Not many days later he was to lose his life in the Guadarrama pigsties. It seems to me a sign of respect for his death not to associate his name with the report he made to me. [...] I was afraid to ask and curious to know. My visitor knew the story in its details and I had the intimate conviction that he had participated in it, without being able to guess to what degree. That suspicion cut me off." When he told him that Calvo Sotelo had been assassinated Zugazagoitia said: "That attack is war". As soon as the unknown person left, Zugazagoitia phoned Indalecio Prieto who was in Bilbao to inform him of the assassination of the monarchist leader and to ask him to take "the first train to Madrid, where you may be needed".

According to what the Socialist Juan Simeón Vidarte told many years later, the Captain of the Civil Guard Fernando Condés, the head of the group that had assassinated Calvo Sotelo, showed up at the PSOE headquarters, in Carranza Street, at half past eight in the morning of that Monday the 13th (almost at the same time that Cuenca allegedly told Zugazagoitia what had happened). He asked to speak with Prieto, with Lamoneda or with him. As the first two were not in Madrid, they called him at home and Vidarte quickly went to the headquarters. When he arrived, Condés was pale, discomposed, "with red eyes". When asked what was wrong, Condés told him: "Something terrible. Last night we killed Calvo Sotelo". "The shock I felt was one of the most terrible received in my life," Vidarte wrote. Condés said that it had not been his intention for the trip to end with the assassination of the monarchist leader, but that they only intended to kidnap him to hold him hostage —and with him the other two leaders of the right: José María Gil-Robles and Antonio Goicoechea—, but added: "Was Calvo Sotelo's life worth more than those of Faraudo and Castillo or any of the comrades the Falangists are assassinating?" Vidarte showed him his disgust for the assassination and his refusal to defend him as a lawyer if he were arrested ("As a member of the Party you will find someone to defend you in court. Certainly not me. I am repulsed by this crime... That murder is going to be used against the Government and the Popular Front. It has been a barbarity of incalculable consequences", Vidarte told him). When asked by Condés whether he should turn himself in, Vidarte replied that it would be better for him to wait and to look for a place to hide, if he had one ("I do not consider myself empowered to make a decision of this importance. I have listened to you as in confession or as a lawyer listens to a defendant. Even if you were not the material author of the murder, you are the one who commanded the expedition and your responsibility is the same. I suppose that you will have somewhere to hide, while we see what the consequences of this assassination may be..."). Condés told him that he could hide in the house of the Socialist deputy Margarita Nelken. "There they will not dare to look for me. The guard accompanying her, as a watchman [he was referring to José del Rey], was also in the van."

At 9 o'clock in the morning of that Monday the 13th, the Court of First Instance and Instruction No. 3 of Madrid, which was on duty, took charge of the case of the disappearance of Calvo Sotelo when the Directorate General of Security (DGS) informed them at that time that Deputy Calvo Sotelo had been taken from his house in the middle of the night by unknown persons and that the First Criminal Brigade had initiated an investigation to clarify the facts and find the whereabouts of the victim. The head judge was Ursicino Gómez Carbajo, who had already participated in the arrest of the Political Board of the Spanish Phalanx. He was also in charge of opening the investigation into the murder of Lieutenant Castillo. The judge was assisted by the judicial secretary Pedro Pérez Alonso and the authorized officer Emilio Macarrón. Shortly afterwards, the judge received a second communication from the DGS in which they told him that the two guards who were guarding Calvo Sotelo's home had been placed at the disposal of the court. When the judge interrogates them, he realizes the seriousness of the case because they tell him that the arrest of Calvo Sotelo in the wee hours of the morning was carried out by a detachment of Assault Guards who had arrived there in an official van, whose number they do not remember, and that they were under the orders of a captain of the Civil Guard who showed them their documentation. Gómez Carbajo ordered the provisional arrest of the two guardsmen and immediately opened the preliminary investigation. In his testimony before the Francoist judges of the General Cause, Judge Gómez Carbajo, who according to Ian Gibson tried to "implicate the Republican authorities in the crime," harshly criticized the alleged inaction of the police: "I make detailed mention of the testimony of the Security guards, because he gives the key for any police body of medium professional and ethical solvency to follow a path that indeclinably had to lead to the clarification of the crime and the presentation before the Court of its confessed perpetrators, together with the elements of conviction, within a very limited period of hours. But the Security Directorate of Madrid remained in a punishable quietism...".

The first step of the investigation is to order the First Criminal Brigade to bring to court the assault guards who were on duty that night in the Pontejos barracks, after having found out that several vans had left the barracks during the early hours of the morning. He also ordered that the doorman of Calvo Sotelo's estate and all the witnesses in the house who were not relatives be taken to the court. Shortly after, the driver Orencio Bayo Cambronero is taken to the court, but he denies having provided any service during the night and alleges that the truck number 17 that he was in charge of had appeared that morning in a different place than the one where he had left it. He continues to deny it even when he is recognized by the two guards who were guarding the doorway of Calvo Sotelo's house, by the doorman, by the governess and by the bellboy. He had said the same when, before being taken to court, he had been interrogated at the DGS by Commissioner Aparicio. According to Ian Gibson, "his stubborn refusal to confess his participation in the events or, more correctly, his presence while they were being consummated, made it considerably more difficult to clarify the crime quickly".

As soon as he was informed that the body of Calvo Sotelo had been found, Judge Gómez Carbajo went to the cemetery to examine it. He checks that he has two bullet holes in the back of his head. He then went to the Pontejos barracks to inspect the van. He sees that it has been washed, but nevertheless observes that between the floorboards there are traces of blood. He orders it to be taken to the basement of the Guard Court for a detailed forensic analysis and also seizes the service book of the 2nd Company, to which Lieutenant Castillo belonged (he later verifies that the services corresponding to the night of the 12th to the 13th are not listed). He returns to the court where he is informed that no news has been received from the police as to who the perpetrators of the murder might be. He then proposes to organize a lineup with the Assault Guards of Lieutenant Castillo's company and also calls to testify Lieutenants Máximo Moreno and Alfonso Barbeta (the latter, to avoid being recognized by the witnesses, removes three of those who were in van number 17 —Aniceto Castro Piñeira, Bienvenido Pérez and Ricardo Cruz Cousillos— from the list of Assault Guards who must appear in court, alleging that they are on duty). In addition to the driver Orencio Bayo, two guards are recognized by the witnesses (the two security guards, the governess, the bellboy and the doorman) and were arrested —none of them had anything to do with the crime; one of them will allege years later that he was mistaken for another one—. From the interrogation of Lieutenants Máximo Moreno and Alfonso Barbeta the judge only gets evasive answers (Ian Gibson suggests that instead of Lieutenant Moreno it could have been Captain Moreno, and that the judge was mistaken when three years later he related the facts to the judges of the General Cause). Both deny having been on duty the night before. According to Ian Gibson, "the greatest culprit in the initial cover-up of the crime was Lieutenant Alfonso Barbeta, whose pusillanimity would become evident when he appeared before the examining magistrate... Barbeta was the one who, more than anyone else, hindered the judicial proceedings aimed at solving the crime". In his statement in the General Cause, the guard Aniceto Castro Piñeiro, one of the three guards that Lieutenant Barbeta removed from the lineup, stated that he told them: "Do not worry; nothing will be clarified; the Director General of Security, the Minister of the Interior and the entire Government are responsible for what happened; nothing can happen to you". Ian Gibson wonders: "Did Barbeta really say these words, or did Castro Piñeiro, whose life was in danger for having participated in the Calvo Sotelo affair, overburden himself by testifying before Franco's judges?" Alfonso Bullón de Mendoza does give credibility to the testimony of Aniceto Castro, "the only right wing guard who participated in the arrest". "Although it cannot be ruled out that Castro invented this detail after the war, we do not think it impossible that Barbeta made such a statement, since the more supported the guardsmen involved considered themselves, the less willing they would be to relate the facts."

At nine o'clock in the evening, Judge Gómez Carbajo suspends the lineup with the intention of resuming it the following day. In spite of the hour he decides to go to Calvo Sotelo's home to carry out an ocular inspection and interrogate the family. He speaks with the widow whose testimony coincides with what was declared by the governess and the people on duty. When he returns to the Duty Court around midnight, Supreme Court Judge Eduardo Iglesias Portal, who has been appointed by the Government as special judge in the case, is waiting for him. From that moment on this judge is the one who will be in charge of the summary of the Calvo Sotelo assassination. Alfonso Bullón de Mendoza comments that Iglesias Portal will be the judge who will preside over the trial against José Antonio Primo de Rivera.

That night Luis Cuenca dined with another socialist militant in a cheap restaurant near the PSOE headquarters on Carranza Street in Madrid. When he heard the comments of some diners who had just read the special edition that the conservative evening newspaper Ya had published about the death of Calvo Sotelo he began to say: "But you are all wrong! It was not like that! I am going to explain how it was!". His companion finally managed to calm him down so that he would not speak.

In the early morning hours of the following day, Tuesday, July 14, Antonio Piga Pascual, accompanied by three other forensic doctors, performed the autopsy on Calvo Sotelo's corpse. He certified that there were two bullet holes in the occipital region produced by two shots "fired at point-blank range, almost simultaneously", with a "short nine" pistol and that the position of the assassin was "in a posterior plane and at the level of the assaulted". One of the projectiles was lodged in the brain and the other exited through the left orbital region. He also certified that death was instantaneous due to "bulbar syncope of traumatic origin" and that the corpse did not present any wound or bruise that could indicate that there had been a struggle in the van, denying a sensationalist report that appeared in the press. These same forensic experts have verified that the blood found in the van belongs to the same ABMN serological group as that of the deceased. This is the only advance in the investigation. Special Judge Iglesias Portal has not received any new information from the police nor has he initiated new proceedings. He has only issued an indictment against the driver of the van, Orencio Bayo, who was already in custody, and has met with the public prosecutor Paz Mateos, with the lieutenant prosecutor Vallés and with Commissioner Lino.

When on Wednesday afternoon, the 15th, after having participated in the tense meeting of the Permanent Deputation of the Cortes, Indalecio Prieto returned to his house on Carranza Street, he found a crowd at the doors of the building. The building also housed the editorial office of El Socialista and the PSOE. Among those gathered was Fernando Condés, who, according to Stanley G. Payne, had hidden in the home of Socialist deputy Margarita Nelken. Condés greeted him and Prieto called him aside to speak with him. The Socialist leader told him: "the summary for the death of Calvo Sotelo shows that it was you who arrested the victim". "I know," Condés replied, "but I don't care about myself anymore. Overwhelmed by shame, despair and dishonor, I am ready to take my own life". But Prieto, who at no time encouraged him to give himself up to justice, told him: "To commit suicide would be stupid. You will have plenty of opportunities to heroically sacrifice your life in the struggle that, inevitably, will begin soon, in days or hours." "You are right," Condés replied. As a young Socialist witness to the scene told Ian Gibson many years later, "Prieto made no secret of his disgust at the assassination of Calvo Sotelo. Noticing Don Inda's reaction, Condés reached for his pistol with the evident intention of shooting himself. Several of those present held him down, and one of them said to him: "But Condés, man, what madness! You did well killing Calvo Sotelo". And then Condés calmed down a little". According to this same witness, Condés had not taken refuge in the house of the Socialist deputy Margarita Nelken, but, together with Luis Cuenca, in the house of a mutual friend. Alfonso Bullón de Mendoza believes that Indalecio Prieto lied when in his memoirs Convulsiones de España (onvulsions of Spainh) e wrote that the meeting with Condés took place on Wednesday 15th in the afternoon, after the meeting of the Permanent Commission. He thinks that "the interview should have been earlier." "Prieto was informed from the first moment of Condés' involvement by both Vidarte and Zugazagoitia, but it seemed to him... unpresentable to publicly acknowledge that he knew the ins and outs of the crime before he made his speech on July 15 [at the Permanent Deputation].

Two days later, Friday, July 17, the evening newspaper Heraldo de Madrid reported that the special judge Eduardo Iglesias Portal had ordered the arrest of Fernando Condés, although the censorship had concealed his name and his condition as captain of the Civil Guard —according to the summary, the widow of Calvo Sotelo had recognized him in a photograph shown to her as one of the persons who had raided her house—. The newspaper also reported that the previous day the special judge had been in the Model Prison to carry out "several examinations and confrontations in the presence of the Attorney General of the Republic, and as a result of this work the conviction of the innocence of the two Assault Guards who since last Monday had been detained and held incommunicado was acquired. On the contrary, the situation of the driver [Orencio Bayo Cambronero] is more and more compromised. Once again, he has been recognized by the guards who were on duty at the door of Mr. Calvo Sotelo's house, by a maid, the doorman of the estate and other people. Notwithstanding these accusations, the driver persists in his denial, but the special judge has issued against him an indictment and imprisonment". The newspaper also reported that "as a result of the recent actions, several people have been placed at the disposal of the special judge", but the censorship had eliminated the rest of the news item, so it was not possible to know who they were. At that time the judge had also agreed to the search and capture of José del Rey —which would never be achieved— and the arrest of three more Assault Guards (Tomás Pérez Figuero, who had helped Bayo to clean the blood stains from the van; Bienvenido Pérez Rojo, who had participated in the expedition commanded with Condés; and Antonio San Miguel Fernández, who had not actually intervened in the crime). That same morning of Friday the 17th the special judge and the public prosecutor of the Republic were optimistic about the progress of the investigation and that "it would not be difficult to find out who were the authors of the kidnapping and the crime". That same afternoon the coup d'état of July 1936 began in the Spanish Protectorate in Morocco.

Condés was never arrested and no arrest warrant was ever issued for Luis Cuenca, the perpetrator of the crime, and for the other three members of the socialist militias that accompanied him. As soon as the civil war began, Cuenca and Condés were named officers of the militias that left Madrid to fight in the battle of Guadarrama —apparently Condés had previously participated in the Siege of the Montaña barracks— and there they fell in combat (Cuenca died on July 22 trying to take Somosierra together with other comrades of "La Motorizada"; Condés died a week later after being wounded on July 26 near Somosierra, also fighting with "La Motorizada", and received a multitudinous burial; his funeral oration was pronounced by the socialist deputy Margarita Nelken: "We needed Fernando Condés for the day of the triumph. Those of us who had the good fortune of knowing him intimately know how useful he would have been to us. Fernando has left us, but he will always be among us"; in addition, the General Headquarters of the Popular Militias was named after him). The other three socialists implicated in the assassination (Francisco Ordóñez, Santiago Garcés Arroyo and Federico Coello, were also assigned to relevant posts in the Republican forces. Garcés became head of the Military Intelligence Service, Ordóñez head of the State Information Service and Coello commander of Military Health. Lieutenant Máximo Moreno, who was suspected of having participated in the attack, but no evidence was found so he was not prosecuted, died on September 22, 1936 after his plane crashed (he committed suicide rather than fall into the hands of Franco's Moorish troops). The Republicans managed to rescue the corpse —it was said that his testicles had been cut off— and the burial, which was celebrated in Madrid, was as multitudinous as that of Condés. The driver Bayo Cambronero was released on July 25, returning to the service of the Mobile Park of the Assault Guard. The Assault Guard José del Rey, whose arrest had been ordered, was never captured by the judicial authorities in Madrid. He marched to Toledo at the head of a hundred militiamen to participate in the Siege of the Alcázar in Toledo and later was at the head of various units of the Popular Army of the Republic, reaching the rank of commander. Lieutenant Alfonso Barbeta was imprisoned for the harangue he made to the guards of Lieutenant Castillo's company on the night of the 12th, but was released on August 8. On the same date the guards Tomás Pérez, Antonio San Miguel and Bienvenido Pérez Rojo were also released.

On July 25, a week after the beginning of the war, a group of ten or twelve socialist militiamen burst into the headquarters of the Supreme Court and at gunpoint seized the case file on the assassination of Calvo Sotelo. They came close to shooting Special Judge Iglesias Portal, but his police escort prevented it. According to Ian Gibson, the militiamen were friends of Captain Fernando Condés and belonged to "La Motorizada", "eager to destroy the evidence against him in the case file. The stolen documents were immediately burned by the militiamen...". The special judge resigned because of what had happened, but the Supreme Court's Governing Chamber did not accept it and ordered him to reconstruct the stolen summary "in the average and form that the present circumstances permit". It was an almost impossible mission because, as Ian Gibson pointed out, "many witnesses were already outside Madrid, fighting in the Sierra and on other fronts. Others had fled, or were hiding in the capital. Others had died, or would die soon, as was the case of Cuenca and Condés. And above all there was the fact that Spain was already immersed in a terrible civil war, one of the main causes of which, in the opinion of the left, was Calvo Sotelo himself". The court officer Emilio Macarrón, who confronted the militiamen to try to prevent them from taking the case, declared before the judges of the General Cause that "when the National Movement began on July 18, 1936, judicial work was almost impossible, since the mere fact of naming Mr. Calvo Sotelo or speaking of the investigation of the case for his assassination produced indignation and excitement in the people of the left wing".

In spite of everything, an attempt was made to reconstruct the summary based on Emilio Macarrón's recollections of the proceedings that had been carried out up to July 25. And others were also included, such as a new statement taken from Assault Lieutenant Alfonso Barbeta, who stated that he gathered the guards of Lieutenant Castillo's company to tell them "to be resigned to what had happened" and that he had no participation in the assassination of Calvo Sotelo "nor does he know who carried it out". Macarrón's document and the rest of the documents of the reconstructed summary disappeared or were lost during or after the war. They reappeared in 1970 and were incorporated into Franco's General Cause. On October 7, 1936, the General Directorate of Security informed Judge Iglesias Portal that it had discovered the perpetrators of the assassination of Calvo Sotelo. According to the DGS, the "perpetrator" had been Captain Angel Cuenca Gómez  and the "instigator" Captain Fernando Condés, but neither of them could be arrested because they had died. The letter ended by saying: "However, as regards the others who may have had a role in the matter, efforts are still being made and I will inform you of any positive results". On February 1, 1937, an order was issued to terminate the investigation in application of the amnesty which a week earlier, on January 22, had been decreed for those convicted and indicted for political and common crimes committed prior to July 15, 1936.

At the end of the civil war, four of the Assault Guardsmen who were in van number 17 were arrested and interrogated by Franco's judges: Aniceto Castro Piñeiro, Bienvenido Pérez Rojo, Orencio Bayo Cambronero (the driver) and José del Rey. The latter, tried and condemned to death for the assassination of Calvo Sotelo, was executed by garrote vil in 1943. Del Rey exonerated the rest of the guards in his statement: "The guardsmen occupying the van were unaware of the service to be performed. They then went to Velázquez Street and stopped in front of a house, at the door of which there were two Security Guards. Then they found out that Don José Calvo Sotelo lived there". Commander Ricardo Burillo, head of the Group of Assault Guards of Pontejos, was also condemned to death in a court martial and executed for being considered one of those directly responsible for the death of Calvo Sotelo, "an absolutely unfounded charge", according to Ian Gibson. The driver Bayo Cambronero was condemned to death, but the death penalty was commuted to thirty years in prison. He spent seven or eight years in Porlier prison and was later released.

Ian Gibson concludes: "at the end of the war, then, that crime had not been thoroughly investigated. Nor did Franco's judges succeed in clearing it up". Gibson points out that there is no evidence that the assassination of Calvo Sotelo was planned before the attack on Lieutenant Castillo, nor that the Republican Government was implicated. An assessment that is shared by historians such as Hugh Thomas: "the possibility of a premeditated assassination cannot be totally excluded, but certainly the government was not implicated in it." What there is doubt about, as Hugh Thomas warns, is whether the assassination was premeditated or was a spontaneous action by Luis Cuenca. After the exhaustive research he carried out for his book La noche en que mataron a Calvo Sotelo (The night Calvo Sotelo was killed), published in 1982, Gibson believes that there is no doubt that it was premeditated. He provides as evidence, first of all, the letter that the then artillery lieutenant Urbano Orad de la Torre sent in 1978 to the newspaper El País in which he stated that in a meeting of UMRA officers, to which he also belonged, it was decided to assassinate a prominent right wing leader in retaliation for the murder of Lieutenant Castillo, also a member of the UMRA, and in fulfillment of the threat that Orad de la Torre himself had made to the members of the right wing Spanish Military Union after the murder of Captain Carlos Faraudo, also a member of the UMRA. Secondly, Gibson considers that the complicity of Captain Condés is proven because "we find it quite difficult to believe that, upon hearing the shots fired by the captain of the Civil Guard, he did not immediately order the van to stop." "Overwhelmed by the death of his friend Castillo and convinced of the imminence of the "fascist" uprising, would it be surprising that he agreed with Luis Cuenca, a well-known gunman, so that the latter would carry out the fatal shots, while he directed the operation? It seems to us no, just as it seems to us that the other socialist occupants of the van did not know what was going to happen," states Ian Gibson.

Reactions

Response of Casares Quiroga's Government 

The government began its meeting at ten o'clock in the morning at the headquarters of the Presidency. At that time the body of Calvo Sotelo had not yet been found, but as soon as Casares Quiroga received the news —he commented to the military aide who gave it to him: "What a mess they have gotten us into"—, he contacts the president of the Cortes to propose to suspend their sessions for at least a week until tempers calm down and to avoid the risk of incidents, in which Diego Martínez Barrio agrees completely (among other reasons because to avoid serious altercations the deputies would have to be searched, since many of them used to go armed to the Congress). In fact, the president of the Cortes informed him that he had already contacted the various parliamentary groups and that they had given their agreement, except for the CEDA, which wanted an ordinary session to be held to deal with what had happened (the monarchists also rejected the suspension, but not outright). Another of the initiatives taken by Casares Quiroga is to request the presence in the Council of Ministers of the Attorney General of the Republic and the Undersecretary of Justice, Jerónimo Gomáriz, to consult them about the two possible candidates for special judges that he intends to appoint to take charge of the respective investigations of Lieutenant Castillo and Calvo Sotelo.

Around two o'clock in the afternoon the government meeting was suspended until six o'clock. On the way out, the ministers —"with countenances whose gravity accentuates their circumspect sadness"— are besieged with questions by the journalists, but the only one who makes a brief statement is that of Enrique Ramos: "As you will understand, we have examined the execrable events which we all regret and which, of course, have given rise to the adoption of various measures and to the judicial action which has already begun, with the appointment of two special judges. The Government has not yet compiled all the data. When we have complete information, the Government will provide a detailed note explaining the event". President Casares Quiroga, for his part, evaded the journalists' questions and referred them to the explanations that could be given by the Minister of the Interior, "who had gone at that moment to the Ministry to be duly informed". The Minister of the Interior had just told them: "I do not yet have an account of the event, because I have not yet been able to take care of it".

The afternoon newspapers hit the streets with blank spaces which have been suppressed by censorship. The government, under the state of alarm which has been in force since the February elections, has decided to redouble its censorship to avoid the use of the word "assassination" to describe the death of Calvo Sotelo and to prevent the intervention of the forces of law and order in the death of Calvo Sotelo. However, the conservative newspaper Ya has managed to launch an extraordinary edition that has escaped the censorship control. On its front page there is a big headline informing about the death of Calvo Sotelo and on its inside pages there is abundant information about what happened (it was said that among the perpetrators of the crime there were Assault Guards and a captain of the Civil Guard, whose name was unknown). The government ordered the police to collect all the copies (but many had already been sold, as the success of this special edition of Ya was extraordinary) and then decreed its indefinite suspension under the accusation of having spread false news about the death of Calvo Sotelo —when two journalists from Ya get the Minister of the Interior to receive them to ask for the suspension to be lifted, Juan Moles tells them that when he gave them permission to publish the special edition by telephone, he did not authorize them to say that the crime had been committed by Assault Guards—. The government did the same with the also conservative newspaper La Época, because it considered it a provocation that its director José Ignacio Escobar, Marquis of Las Marismas, had refused to publish it on the streets when the censorship prohibited him from using the term "murder". La Época would never reappear, after almost a century of existence. El Día in Alicante and El Lunes in Oviedo were also suspended for evading censorship.

Early in the evening, when the second part of the Council of Ministers' meeting, which had resumed at six o'clock in the afternoon, ended, a brief note was issued. Instead of including a resounding condemnation of the assassination of one of the two main opposition leaders and committing to arrest and bring to justice the culprits —neither Luis Cuenca nor Fernando Condés were ever arrested—, the note limits itself to condemning and equating (which Gil-Robles complained about) the assassinations of both Calvo Sotelo and Lieutenant Castillo ("The Council of Ministers, in view of the acts of violence which have culminated in the death of the Security officer Mr. Castillo and the deputy to Cortes Mr. José Calvo Sotelo, facts of notorious gravity, and for the execration of which it must formulate the most sincere and ardent protests, it believes it is appropriate to make a public statement to the effect that it will immediately proceed with the greatest energy and the clearest severity, within the precepts of the law of Public Order, to take all those measures demanded by the need to maintain the spirit of coexistence among Spaniards and the elementary respect for the rights of human life") and to inform of the appointment of a special judge for each case, both magistrates of the Supreme Court (Enrique Iglesias Portal for that of Calvo Sotelo and Sánchez Orbeta for that of Castillo). According to Luis Romero, it seems to be a note of circumstances ("Anodyne note", Gil-Robles would call it) which "does not respond to the gravity of the facts" and which does not go to the bottom of the problem (it is limited to announcing that all the resources of the Law of Public Order will be applied "wherever the evil takes place and whatever the affiliation of its authors or its inspirers"). Alfonso Bullón de Mendoza shares this assessment: "the note given to the press could not have been more disheartening for those who expected a swift reaction from the Executive, because instead of facing the exceptional seriousness of the case, the Government drafted a bland text in which the deaths of Calvo Sotelo and Castillo were equated, assassinations which from a humanitarian point of view were equally reprehensible, but which evidently did not have the same political relevance". In the only paragraph of the note that seems to depart from this general tone of circumstances it is stated:

The note ended as follows:

According to Luis Romero, "the Government, which has lost control of the situation and is aware of its own weakness, is unable to regain the initiative. For the moment it has relieved itself on the duty judge and now appoints... a special judge to hear the case and, to reestablish the balance and make it clear that the death of Calvo Sotelo was a consequence of that of Lieutenant Castillo, it appoints... another magistrate to clarify this crime". Gabriele Ranzato considers that the government made a terrible mistake. "Casares had the imperative to issue statements condemning the crime and, above all, to take initiatives to prosecute the culprits even more vigorously than he would normally have taken in the case of any other magnicide. Not so much or not only to remove suspicion, but to try to contain the wave of indignation that this death was provoking and that, as it was not difficult to understand, was taking the country towards the precipice". Furthermore, the absence of a categorical statement by the President of the Government could reinforce the idea spread in right wing circles that he personally was behind the assassination, based on the alleged death threat that Casares Quiroga had made to Calvo Sotelo on June 16 in the Cortes ("It is lawful for me to say after what Your Honor has done today before Parliament, of any case that might occur, which will not occur, I will hold Your Honor responsible before the country."), although the following day no newspaper interpreted Casares Quiroga's words in that sense. Ranzato also considers the silence of the President of the Republic Manuel Azaña a mistake. Alfonso Bullón de Mendoza, for his part, considers that "the President of the Republic did not know, as he had not known in the last few months, how to rise to the circumstances".

At the meeting of the Permanent Deputation which took place on the morning of Wednesday the 15th, the leader of the CEDA, José María Gil-Robles, made a harsh criticism of the government's response to the assassination of Calvo Sotelo:

According to Gabriele Ranzato, "that murder seemed destined to go unpunished, since both the government and the judiciary, and any other authority in charge of the inquiries, were showing slowness and passivity in the pursuit of the culprits, making only a few arrests of secondary participants in the "punitive expedition", while the main culprits, whose identity was not difficult to know, had been left at large". Alfonso Bullón de Mendoza holds a similar position when he considers "evident that in the leaders of the Popular Front the fundamental concern after the assassination of Calvo Sotelo was not to find his assassins, but to crush the uprising which after his death they believed inevitable". Luis Romero, for his part, has stressed that the actions of the Government fed the conviction of the right wing (and of other sectors) that he had ordered it or had been an accomplice in the assassination of Calvo Sotelo. "The clumsiness of the Government, the intervention of uniformed guards and the van used, the slow reaction of Alonso Mallol, the previous mistakes related to the change of escort, and those impolitic and imprudent words of Casares in the session of June 16th, added to the disconcerting way in which censorship was exercised, the physical concealment of those responsible and other contributing causes, have led not only Calvo Sotelo's co-religionists and other right wing militants to that conviction, but also wide areas of the scarcely politicized opinion. It is true that the right wing exploits the unfortunate event, but it is also true that they firmly believe that the impulse —the order— came from above; and each one places the vertex of the homicidal pyramid where their antipathies become more ostensible. There are those who go so far as to involve Azaña".

The lack of initiative of the government to condemn outright and clarify the assassination of Calvo Sotelo may have been due to the enormous pressure it received from the workers' parties and organizations integrated in the Popular Front, outraged by the assassination of Lieutenant Castillo, to act against the right wing. The Socialists, for their part, according to Alfonso Bullón de Mendonza, were very interested in preventing the details of the assassination from becoming known, because if they came to light "the image of the party would be very damaged" ("one of the chiefs of La Motorizada had led the group that appeared at Calvo Sotelo's house and... one of Prieto's bodyguards had assassinated the monarchist leader"). Shortly before midnight on Monday the 13th, prominent leaders of the PSOE (Indalecio Prieto, Juan Simeón Vidarte), the UGT (Manuel Lois Fernández), the JSU (Santiago Carrillo), the PCE (Vicente Uribe) and the Casa de Pueblo in Madrid (Edmundo Domínguez) presented themselves at the Ministry of War, where the President of the Government Casares Quiroga had his office (since in addition to the Presidency he held that portfolio), the JSU (Santiago Carrillo), the PCE (Vicente Uribe) and the Casa del Pueblo in Madrid (Edmundo Domínguez) to offer him all their support if the military uprising that everyone thought was imminent took place, which Casares Quiroga was grateful for, but he gave no importance to the rumors about the possible military coup. Hours later, in the early hours of Tuesday the 14th, these organizations (the CNT had not been invited to the meeting they held) made public a joint note, which according to Luis Romero "ties the hands of the ministers a little in the face of the clarification of the facts and conditions, to some extent, their actions in the face of them":

In the action against the rightists the Government did comply. Nearly two hundred Falangists and rightists were arrested and the Madrid headquarters of Spanish Renovation, Calvo Sotelo's party, were closed. To give the "impression of strength and fairness" he also closed the headquarters of the National Confederation of Labor which at that time was engaged in a fierce struggle with the socialist union UGT over the construction strike in Madrid which had been going on for over a month. The CNT organ Solidaridad Obrera complained about this in its Thursday 16 edition, which hit the streets with the front page headlines censored and with a third of the editorial blank: "Enough already: only madmen and agents provocateurs can establish points of contact between fascism and anarchism! [...] This undignified and ignoble game which weakens the forces of resistance and attack on fascism coinciding in the struggle against the common enemy cannot be allowed... Let the Socialists and Communists keep an eye on the panorama of Spain, and they will see if it suits them to denigrate, insult and discredit the CNT."

Furthermore, taking advantage of the state of alarm, the government strictly prohibited open-air demonstrations and meetings and accentuated to the maximum the censorship of the press, even for the speeches of the deputies in Cortes who until then had enjoyed immunity. Likewise, the government sent a circular on the same 13th to all the civil governors in which it urged them to be alert "on the occasion of the death of Calvo Sotelo":

Stanley G. Payne goes much further on the importance of the pressure from the left to explain the inaction of the Government and directly accuses the Socialist Indalecio Prieto, his "number one ally", of having blocked with his "veto" "an investigation of the crime" that the Government "had begun". "Prieto and his followers continued to hide the assassins of Calvo Sotelo, and there are testimonies of his personal intervention to put an end to the judicial investigation", Payne affirms. In reality there is only one testimony, that of Assault Lieutenant Alfredo León Lupión, who in 1981 told Ian Gibson —to whose book La noche en que mataron a Calvo Sotelo (1982) Payne refers— that in the meeting that Prieto and other leaders of the left held with the President of the Government around midnight on Monday the 13th, Casares Quiroga informed them of his intention to arrest all the officers of the Group of Assault Guards of Pontejos (the commander, the four captains and the seven lieutenants, one of them León Lupión himself) "because it is a crime that cannot be hidden", to which Prieto replied: "If you commit this nonsense, I assure you that the Socialist minority will leave the Congress". And then Casares Quiroga said: "Very well, very well, but the Assault officer who appears with the slightest guilt, that one is arrested". Alfonso Bullón de Mendoza also uses this testimony from Gibson's book —which he also quotes— to support his conjecture that "it is even possible that [Prieto] obstructed the investigation". And then Bullón de Mendoza refers to the interpretation of this fact by the revisionist Pío Moa, who has gone so far as to affirm that Indalecio Prieto was behind the assassination of Calvo Sotelo: "If true, this relationship would prove that if the government of Casares Quiroga did not take more spectacular measures against the assassins of Calvo Sotelo it was because it was prevented by pressure from the PSOE, and in such a case Prieto's responsibility in the unleashing of the civil war would be hardly exaggerated, since he would have prevented the only indicative to the right that Casares Quiroga was willing to make." In reality what Lieutenant León Lupión intended by relating the confrontation between Casares Quiroga and Prieto was to demonstrate that the government was not involved in the assassination. "A man who takes this position [Casares Quiroga] is not a man committed to the crime," he had also told Ian Gibson, who, on the other hand, makes no interpretation of what the lieutenant has told him.

Casares Quiroga even presented his resignation to the President of the Republic, Azaña, but the latter did not accept it, alleging that to do so would be like acknowledging that he had had some responsibility in the crime. Azaña did not heed the advice given to him by Diego Martínez Barrio, President of the Cortes, that he should immediately change the government, that he should act against the right and against the extreme left "with harsh sanctions that would show the recovery of all the levers of power. Perhaps we will not dissipate the storm, but we will succeed in driving it away". Azaña replied: "I know that I must change the Government... But we must wait. If I were to accept the resignation that Casares has presented to me, it would be as much as handing over his honor to the slander that accuses him. It is not possible for him to jump from power pushed by the assassination of Calvo Sotelo". In the meeting held by the Government in the National Palace at noon on Thursday 16th presided over by Azaña, some ministers expressed themselves in favor of giving entry into the cabinet to some centrist personality in order to contribute to the appeasement that the country needed. They also expressed their concern for the infiltration of the State apparatus, as had been made clear by the assassination of Calvo Sotelo.

Response from the left 

Unlike most of the rest of the leaders of the left, Diego Martínez Barrio, president of the Cortes, was completely shocked. This is how Luis Romero highlights it: "leaving aside relatives, friends and co-religionists, one of the people who was most affected by what happened and the circumstances that aggravated it was Diego Martínez Barrio, despite the fact that the political distances between him and the deceased were unbridgeable...". Alfonso Bullón de Mendoza notes the same thing with nuances: he was "one of the few leaders of the left who seems to have sincerely felt sorry for the homicide". As soon as he heard the news of the discovery of Calvo Sotelo's body he asked the Count of Vallellano to go immediately to his house. When the latter arrived, accompanied by other deputies of the monarchist minority, Martínez Barrio told him in tears and in a broken voice: "For the same reasons as you and many others that will not escape your perspicacity, no one but me deplores this stain that falls on the Republic, and whose consequences no one can foresee to what extent they will reach". A journalist of the Catholic newspaper El Debate who spoke with him shortly afterwards wrote that he was "truly overwhelmed by the event".

Martínez Barrio did not put on the same level the assassination of Calvo Sotelo, whose figure he publicly praised, and that of Lieutenant Castillo, as did most of the rest of the leaders of the left, and refrained from establishing a causal relationship between the two crimes. He was also one of the few politicians of the Popular Front who was aware that the assassination and its circumstances made it necessary to change the policy followed until then by the left. This is how he put it privately to the President of the Republic, Manuel Azaña. He told him that he believed it was necessary to form a new government ready to impose "harsh sanctions that would show the recovery of all the levers of power". In order to avoid breaking the Popular Front Martínez Barrio did not clearly state what he thought, but he did so in a veiled way when on the night of the 13th he told journalists (which also implied a criticism of the government): "It is not possible for citizens to see that the State does not guarantee their security. We must all do our part to put an end to the situation that this event reveals...". The newspaper La Vanguardia in its edition of the following day put it more clearly: "Either a guiding Government finally rises in Spain, a Government that truly governs, imposing itself and disarming everyone, or the torrential waters of anarchy will swell and rise until they submerge us in a wave of barbarism". For his part, Antoni Rovira i Virgili wrote in La Humanitat, the press organ of the Republican Left of Catalonia: "Let the rulers vigorously enforce compliance with the laws. But let there be order in the streets, in the workplaces and in the homes. Let there be an authentic Republic and not a mess with violence and the blood from crimes." Another left wing Republican politician who was aware of the seriousness and implications of the assassination of Calvo Sotelo was Mariano Ansó, who in his memoirs wrote: "After the revolutionary movement of Catalonia and Asturias, this crime was the greatest attack committed against the Republic. When we came to know that the perpetrators were military and law enforcement officers, our indignation rose to a fever pitch. The fact that a few hours earlier Lieutenant Castillo had been vilely assassinated was of no use to us as an excuse".

The one who was able to express himself clearly, possibly because he was not part of the Popular Front coalition, was Felipe Sánchez Román, a friend of Azaña. He was the only left wing Republican politician who roundly and publicly condemned the crime —he had been a fellow student of Calvo Sotelo— saying that "the Republic had been disgraced forever". He was also one of the few who offered his condolences to the family. However, when another left wing Republican, Rafael Sánchez Guerra, went to Calvo Sotelo's home to sign the condolence sheets that had been placed in the doorway, he was booed and rejected. For its part, the parliamentary group of Republican Left demanded that "the extremist struggles by reprehensible and punishable procedures cease forever". In the immediate post-war period, the socialist Julián Zugazagoitia, then editor of the newspaper El Socialista, recognized that the assassination of Calvo Sotelo had been a "truly monstrous" event.

The pro-government Republican press highlighted the assassination of Lieutenant Castillo more than that of Calvo Sotelo, while the right wing press such as ABC and El Debate did the opposite, although in inferior conditions because the government forbade them to publish any commentary. One of the few newspapers that tried to maintain a certain balance was Ahora, which published photographs of the two victims on its front page and in the inside pages described the two deaths as "abominable crimes".

Política, the unofficial organ of Republican Left, put on the front page in large font accompanied by an image "The Assault Lieutenant Don José Castillo murdered by gunmen", while dedicating a small headline at the bottom of the page to the assassination of Calvo Sotelo which read: "Violent death of Mr. Calvo Sotelo. The monarchist leader is arrested at his home and his corpse appears in the cemetery". In the editorial it attacks the reactionaries who await "the occasion to make an assault on power", but also the hotheads who apply the law of retaliation because "they contribute to provide flags to the enemies of the regime, who, without ceasing in their tactic of error, present themselves as victims of persecution that does not exist". El Liberal said in its editorial dedicated to the two murders: "If they do what they do when they are in the opposition, what would they not do when they are in power? Those who, in the absence of the people's suffrage, resort to violence, are incapable of governing. The Republic will follow its path, serene, unshakable, imposing by degree or by force the national will". La Libertad wrote: "We do not accept violence, but neither do we tolerate the murder of the people, drowning them in waves of tyranny and misery".

The socialist caballerist newspaper Claridad devoted its entire front page to the assassination of Lieutenant Castillo and the assassination of Calvo Sotelo was relegated to the last page, devoting only a few lines to it. Much further went the also caballerist El Obrero de la Tierra of July 18 —without having had time to cover in its pages the previous day's uprising of the army in the Spanish Protectorate in Morocco— since it justified the assassination of Calvo Sotelo by affirming that his death had been the "logical consequence of these latest fascist criminal attacks" carried out by "the mercenary gangs for hire of reaction", and then called for the organization of the "Popular Militias". To the cadres of the socialist militias he urged them to maintain "constant communication among themselves to help each other and to concentrate wherever necessary in order to inexorably crush fascism, as soon as it wants to begin its announced uprising against the Republic and the workers". If fascism triumphed, said El Obrero de la Tierra, "blood will flow in torrents. And before that happens it is better for theirs to flow than ours".

Even more radical was the response of the Communist Party of Spain (PCE), whose secretary general José Díaz, a week earlier, had already criticized the government for making "concessions to the enemy, driven by an absurd desire for coexistence". The PCE presented a bill on the afternoon of the 13th itself (and which was published by Mundo Obrero) which called for nothing less than the suppression of the right wing opposition ("Article 1. All organizations of a reactionary and fascist character, such as Spanish Phalanx, Spanish Renovation, CEDA, Valencian Regional Right and those which, due to their characteristics, are akin to these, will be dissolved, and the movable and immovable property of such organizations, their leaders and inspirers will be confiscated"), the imprisonment of their leaders ("Art. 2. All those known for their reactionary, fascist and anti-republican activities will be imprisoned and prosecuted without bail") and the confiscation of their press ("Art. 3. The newspapers El Debate, Ya, Informaciones, ABC and all the reactionary press of the provinces will be confiscated by the Government"). They "justified" it in the preamble of the proposal where he held responsible "the reactionary and fascist elements, declared enemies of the Republic", for the "assassination of the best defenders of the people and of the regime" (in reference to Lieutenant Castillo) and accused them of "conspiring against the security" of "the people".

For its part, the PSOE, whose Executive Committee was controlled by the centrists of Indalecio Prieto, called a meeting of the workers' forces which was attended by the PCE, the Casa del Pueblo of Madrid, the JSU and the UGT. In the joint note which was made public in the early hours of Tuesday, July 14, support was offered to the government for the "defense of the regime". In the morning an article of his entitled "Apostillas a unos sucesos sangrientos" (Apostilles to some bloody events) appeared in El Liberal of Bilbao, owned by Prieto, which was reproduced the following day, in whole or in part, by all the pro-government press. The article, which according to Luis Romero impressed "the readers of both sides and the public in general", began by recounting the series of "political crimes" which of one kind or another had been taking place in Madrid since the incidents during the funeral of Anastasio de los Reyes, praising in passing the actions of Lieutenant Castillo, and then called for an end to them: "I simply say that, for the honor of us all, this cannot continue". He then reported on the meeting of the workers' organizations, stressing that they had put aside their differences to confront the "enemy" —"all discord was drowned out. Facing the enemy, union," he wrote—. The article ended with the following warning:

As soon as Francisco Largo Caballero and the rest of the members of the UGT leadership who had traveled to London to attend the Socialist International Trade Union Congress arrived in Madrid that same Tuesday 14th in the afternoon, they stated that they did not express their solidarity with the joint note signed by the member of the executive that had remained in Spain. The reason was that the caballerists did not recognize the PSOE Executive Committee controlled by the centrists, which they considered "factious". They finally agreed to meet with the PSOE executive and the rest of the workers' organizations of the Popular Front on July 16, one day before the military uprising began, so as not to overrule their representative at the first meeting, but the UGT envoy stated that he could not make any agreement without consulting his executive. In the document which was finally approved, with the abstention of the UGT, it was urged to prepare workers' committees throughout Spain to organize "popular militias", to ask the government for weapons for them and to purge the military. The government was even offered the possibility of joining these committees —a sort of "armed soviets", according to Stanley G. Payne—. "The political language of everyone had changed. Since the PSOE knew that it could not propose to the caballerists to enter the Government, they agreed, with Communist consent, to defend the Republic from exclusively workers' and armed organs of power. From such a proposal the State was left defenseless, because the socialists did not come to its aid by integrating into it, but they would defend it from their own organs of power, to the point that the representatives of the Government parties could participate in them, without considering that it was those governmental ones who had to demand them to defend the State within their institutions and not through parallel powers".

The then editor of the newspaper El Socialista and deputy Julián Zugazagoitia, of the prietist sector, recalled in exile immediately after the end of the war that "among my colleagues there was no unanimity in judging the attack. I heard from one of them the following opinion: —The death of Calvo Sotelo gives me neither sorrow nor joy. In order to condemn that attack it would be necessary that those who shot down Faraudo and Castillo had not taken place. As for the consequences that are now being talked about, I do not think we should fear them. The Republic has the proletariat on its side, and that adhesion makes it, if not untouchable, then invincible". The same confidence had been shown a few days earlier by the leader of the radical sector of the PSOE, Francisco Largo Caballero, who at a rally held in Madrid before traveling to London had said: "If they want to give themselves the pleasure of staging a coup d'etat by surprise, let them do it... The working class cannot be defeated." During his stay in London, Largo Caballero had reiterated in a statement to the News Chronicle (the article was titled: "Interview with one of the most important men in Spain today, who perhaps will become as famous as Lenin") the political strategy he had conceived since he agreed to join the Popular Front: "When it [the Republican Government] fails we will replace it and then it will be our program and not theirs that will be carried out." He also gave another interview to the Daily Express in which he was called the "Spanish Lenin". The main ideologist of Caballeroism Luis Araquistain wrote in a letter to his daughter (or his wife) as soon as he learned of the assassination of Calvo Sotelo: "I believe that Caballero would have to be the president or we would not accept anything else. [...] It seems to me that we are entering the most dramatic phase of the Republic. Either our dictatorship comes or the other".

The funeral of Lieutenant Castillo, which took place in the civil cemetery of Madrid on the morning of Tuesday, July 14, was a great demonstration of the strength of the workers' organizations. "The threat of an uprising against the Republic weighed that morning on all the spirits," recalled many years later a young medical student, a Socialist sympathizer, who attended the funeral. When the funeral was over and those who had participated in it left the civil cemetery they ran into those who were attending the burial of Calvo Sotelo in the East cemetery. "The avenue of Daroca [which connects both cemeteries] was crowded with people from both sides. There were confrontations, shouts, threats, raised fists and Roman salutes. The atmosphere could not have been more tense." That same night Indalecio Prieto wrote an article entitled "La España actual reflejada en el cementerio" (Current Spain reflected in the cemetery) which was published the following day by his newspaper El Liberal of Bilbao. In it he said:

Commotion on the right (and in the liberal sectors) and funeral 

The shock —and indignation— caused by the assassination of Calvo Sotelo spread throughout Spain ("the Spanish middle class was stupefied by this assassination of the leader of the parliamentary opposition by members of the regular police, even though they might suspect that the victim had been involved in a conspiracy against the State," comments Hugh Thomas), and not only among the conservative sectors. The family received countless telegrams of condolences from all over, funerals were held in many localities, black ribbons were hung, and thousands of people came to the doorway of Calvo Sotelo's home at 89 Velázquez Street or to the headquarters of Spanish Renovation to sign on the sheets of paper that had been prepared to protest the assassination. On them they wrote phrases such as "Your blood will save Spain!", "Now more than ever, long live Calvo Sotelo!" or the Falangist "¡Arriba España!". The conservative press, both in the capital and outside Madrid, dedicated ample space to the news, although with the limitations imposed by the censorship ordered by the government. El Pueblo Manchego, a Catholic newspaper of Ciudad Real, published an editorial on July 15 in which it asked "What is going to happen here?" and affirmed: "We are at war. Whoever doubts it does not know how to see or understand the realities of Spain". He then raised the need to form a "National Front". "It is so because the life of Spain is seriously threatened" and "to resist the revolutionary push... and to defeat it". The Bar Associations of Madrid and Barcelona agreed on protest letters (the lawyers who signed them would be "purged" by the Republican authorities during the civil war). The Bar Association of Zaragoza sent a telegram to the family of Calvo Sotelo, signed by Dean Monterde, which read: "Dismayed by the monstrous murder of a distinguished, glorious Spaniard, virtuous companion all his life, I protest intense indignation, impious, cruel national shame. May God mercifully welcome the martyred soul of the homeland, which may serve as an example to its last defenders").

The liberal sectors that had supported the Republic were also shocked, especially by the lack of response from the government. Gregorio Marañón, one of the former members of the Association in the Service of the Republic, wrote to Marcelino Domingo on the 16th: "The Government gives the impression of incredible leniency, it makes us who fought against the Monarchy blush and outraged. [...] Spain is ashamed and indignant, as it has never been before" (italics in the original). Among many centrist or conservative leaders the idea was installed that the state was not capable of controlling its security forces, even if it wanted to do so. "Lerroux, or Cambó, or even Gil-Robles, thought that from then on they could not be loyal to a state that could not guarantee their lives. The president of the association of Catholic students, Joaquín Ruiz-Giménez, who had previously defended the line of non-violence, decided that St. Thomas would have approved a rebellion considering it just." Alejandro Lerroux wrote in his memoirs: "By leaving the crime unpunished they [the members of the government] had demonstrated, at least, their impotence to repress and punish it". The former radical minister Salazar Alonso wrote in a letter to a friend on the same day, July 13: "The vile assassination of Calvo Sotelo is confirmed. How appalling! But before this crime we must react like men...!"

From the prison in Alicante where he was imprisoned, the leader of the Spanish Phalanx of the JONS José Antonio Primo de Rivera used the assassination of Calvo Sotelo as justification for the coup d'état on the same day, July 17, when it had begun (two days earlier he had sent a letter to General Mola urging him to begin the uprising and had drawn up a manifesto for when it took place which began: "A group of Spaniards, some soldiers and others civilian men, does not want to witness the total dissolution of the homeland. It rises today against the treacherous, inept, cruel and unjust Government that leads it to ruin..."):

A similar reaction was that of the ex-king Alfonso XIII, who in a letter to the Count of Los Andes, one of the royalist liaisons in the coup d'état that was being forged, wrote to him:

The burial was held on the 14th at five o'clock in the afternoon in the East cemetery, only a few hours after the burial of Lieutenant Castillo in the civil cemetery of Madrid, nearby. Calvo Sotelo's corpse had been shrouded in the Franciscan habit, as he had disposed in his will, and the lower part of the coffin was covered with a monarchist flag. The guard of honor was formed by young people from the different Youth of the right wing parties. Along with the widow and the rest of the family, the leaders and deputies of the right wing organizations (José María Gil-Robles, Antonio Goicoechea, Melquíades Álvarez, Joan Ventosa, José Martínez de Velasco, Pedro Sainz Rodríguez, among many others) were present, as well as prominent members of the aristocracy and the upper classes. Also, some high-ranking military officers, such as General Kindelán. The rosary was prayed while the coffin was carried to the grave. The funeral was attended by thousands of militants and right wing sympathizers, many of whom gave the fascist salute. The vice president, the first secretary and the Senior Officer of the Cortes attempted to attend the funeral, but when they arrived at the cemetery they were booed and almost assaulted by many of the attendees, among them, according to Hugh Thomas, "very well-dressed ladies, who shouted that they wanted nothing to do with parliamentarians", and they had to leave. Some shouted "Death to the parliament!" There were also cheers for the Civil Guard, which had been deployed in and around the cemetery. Among the many wreaths accompanying the coffin was one commissioned by former King Alfonso XIII. Antonio Goicoechea, leader of Spanish Renovation, delivered the farewell speech to the deceased (censorship prohibited its reproduction by newspapers):

After the funeral, which the centrist socialist Julián Zugazagoitia considered "a declaration of war to the State", many of the people leaving the cemetery paraded a raised arm and some sang the Falangist anthem Cara al Sol (Facing the Sun). A part of them, among which young people predominate, decided to go in demonstration to the center of Madrid. At the Plaza de Manuel Becerra, a detachment of the Assault Guard cut them off. There were charges, races and incidents, but the demonstrators managed to reorganize and continue advancing along Alcalá Street. Many had been searched by the guards to make sure they were not carrying weapons. When they reached the intersection with General Pardiñas Street —or the intersection with Goya Street, according to other versions— a shot rang out and immediately the guards, who were in one or two vans, descended and began to shoot. Two of the demonstrators were killed and several were seriously wounded. The incidents continue in the center of the capital. In Montera Street one person is seriously wounded by a gunshot. According to various newspapers, the final toll is between two and seven dead and numerous wounded". No guard was hit by a gunshot. This disproportionate action by the forces of public order provoked the protests of three officers of the Assault Guard, who were arrested for this reason. Others demanded a more thorough investigation of the assassination of Calvo Sotelo and even came close to mutiny. Also arrested by their officers were some non-commissioned officers and Assault Guards of the Pontejos Barracks, most belonging to the 2nd Company (Lieutenant Castillo's) and the 5th Company, for showing their discontent at being blamed indiscriminately for the assassination of the monarchist leader.

The following day, Wednesday 15, censorship did not prevent the monarchist newspaper ABC from publishing an obituary for the death of Calvo Sotelo which occupied the entire front page and in which the word "assassinated" appeared. It read: "José Calvo Sotelo, former Minister of Finance and deputy to Cortes. He died assassinated in the early morning of July 13, 1936. RIP. His family, the national forces he represented, his friends and co-religionists, ask for a prayer for the eternal rest of his soul."

Meeting of the Permanent Deputation of the Cortes 

Both the Government and the president of the Cortes agreed that until tempers calmed down, their sessions had to be suspended. But since the CEDA was opposed, because it wanted an ordinary session to be held to discuss what had happened ("Communicate to the perpetrators of Calvo Sotelo's death that tonight I am sleeping at home, in case they want to come and assassinate me", Gil-Robles told Martínez Barrio when he refused to suspend the Cortes; "That is calling us assassins", replied the latter; "You take it wherever you want", replied the former), it was necessary to resort to a decree of the President of the Republic Manuel Azaña who, using the prerogative granted to him by article 81 of the Constitution of 1931 ("The President of the Republic... may suspend the ordinary sessions of the Congress in each legislature for only one month in the first period and for fifteen days in the second") suspended them for eight days. However, the Government could not avoid the meeting of the Permanent Deputation because on July 15 the one-month term of the state of alarm expired, and this had to be renewed every thirty days. Diego Martínez Barrio, president of the Cortes, was hopeful that there would be no incidents as the number of deputies present was much smaller (twenty-two, only seven of them from the right).

Around eleven thirty in the morning of Wednesday, July 15, the meeting of the Permanent Deputation began. It was surprising that the President of the Government, Santiago Casares Quiroga, was not present. In his place the Minister of State Augusto Barcia Trelles and the Minister of the Interior Juan Moles attended. After the reading of the proposal to extend the state of alarm, Martínez Barrio gave the floor to the representative of the monarchist right, Fernando Suárez de Tangil, Count of Vallellano. He read a statement that had been drafted by Pedro Sainz Rodríguez, who later affirmed that "it was a correct statement in form, but of enormous violence". The brutal accusation appears in the second paragraph: the assassination of Calvo Sotelo —"honor and hope of Spain", "spokesman of the anguish suffered by our homeland"— was a "true State crime" —the monarchists had just pointed to the Government as the instigator or accomplice of the crime, although as Sainz Rodríguez acknowledged years later he had no proof, nor did he have it then, but in spite of this the qualification of "State crime" was maintained during the forty years of the Franco dictatorship—.

According to Ian Gibson, "it was therefore a question of using the death of the royalist leader to further discredit a hated government. It did not matter that the assassination had not been, in reality, a State crime, that is to say, ordered by the Government. What was essential was to make people believe that it had been". In fact, two weeks earlier, on July 1, Pedro Sainz Rodríguez in person, with the knowledge of Antonio Goicoechea and Calvo Sotelo, had signed in Rome the purchase of 43 fighter planes with their corresponding armament and ammunition (and fuel and spare parts), for a value of 39.3 million lire (616,000 pounds). Even more important than the Dragon Rapide operation, this purchase of planes from Fascist Italy was, according to Ángel Viñas, "the most important operational contribution made by the royalists for the final preparations for the coup d'état" and meant that the royalists were not preparing for a coup d'état, but "to settle a short war". These planes were the ones that made it possible for General Franco to move the Army of Africa to the peninsula, a decisive fact in his victory in the Spanish civil war.

The document drafted by Sainz Rodriguez and read by the Count of Vallellano went on to say that the assassination of Calvo Sotelo was a crime "without precedent in our political history", since "it had been executed by the agents of authority themselves" and then the responsibility for the "crime of State" was extended to all the political forces supporting the Government (recalling the threat made to Calvo Sotelo by the Socialist Ángel Galarza, but without mentioning his name): "And this has been able to be done thanks to the atmosphere created by the incitements to violence and personal attacks against the right wing deputies which are daily uttered in Parliament. "In the case of Calvo Sotelo, the personal attack is licit and plausible", some have declared". This was followed by a merciless and "Machiavellian" attack against the President of the Government, Casares Quiroga, after mentioning the alleged threat he had made to Calvo Sotelo in the Cortes on June 16:

The statement ended by announcing the withdrawal of the monarchists from the Cortes, but at the same time their commitment to "whoever wants to save Spain":

The president of the Cortes Diego Martínez Barrio asked Suárez de Tangil not to leave the room immediately because he wanted "to make some statements regarding the content of the document which has just been read", to which the royalist deputy agreed: "the attentions and deference which we officially and particularly owe in this tragic case to Mr. President oblige me to comply with his instructions". Martínez Barrio began his speech saying that he understood "the state of pain of Mr. Suárez de Tangil and of the parliamentary representation in whose name he had just read that document", but then he warned that after carefully examining the document he would exclude from the Journal of Sessions those statements "which imply an exacerbation of passions, some accusations on which I do not want to go into, but that at this moment just stating them would contribute to poison the spirits even more than they are". "Neither Mr. Suárez de Tangil nor the representation of his groups should take it as discourtesy, lack of attention and, as far as they are human, absence of collaboration and solidarity with the pain they are experiencing, which is common to all of us, but as foresight, obligatory, much more so in someone who in these moments the circumstances have given him such bitter obligations as the ones that weigh on me". He ended saying: "I hope and wish that the parliamentary withdrawal of the groups of Spanish Renovation and Traditionalist, which have delegated their right to his lordship, is transitory...". Suárez de Tangil complied with his purpose and left the room.

Martínez Barrio ordered to eliminate from the Journal of Sessions the key phrase: a "true crime of State". And also the harsh accusations directed against the President of the Government Casares Quiroga: the sentence "and the President of the Council has threatened Calvo Sotelo with making him responsible a priori, without further investigation, of easily foreseeable events that could take place in Spain" is not included; and the whole paragraph which began saying "Sad fate of this ruler..." and ended with the sentence "...the sad fate of finding in honorable bodies more or less numerous nuclei of murderers." (the whole quote in italics) is eliminated. He also deleted the reference to "crime" from the penultimate paragraph of the statement (in italics in the quote). Gil-Robles protested harshly and threatened to leave the Cortes: "To cross them out [the words of Mr. Suárez de Tangil], to make sure that they do not make it into the minutes, that they are not transcribed in the Journal of Sessions, is something that means an attack on the right, which has never been unknown, of the minorities,...".

After a brief speech by the Minister of State Augusto Barcia lamenting the death of Calvo Sotelo, the leader of the CEDA José María Gil-Robles took the floor, whose speech, according to Gabriele Ranzato, "was, for its efficiency and eloquence, his last great service to the cause of the uprising". His speech, according to Luis Romero, "is aggressive and accusatory; parliamentary speaking he no longer complements Calvo Sotelo, he has merged with him". Gil-Robles begins by denouncing that the state of alarm has been used by the government as an "element of persecution" against the opposition, to then dissociate himself from the accusation of "crime of state" that the royalists had just made. "Far be it from my mind to pick up accusations in balloons, and much less to launch upon the Government, without proof, a slanderous accusation of pretending that the Government is directly mixed up in a criminal act of this nature," he says. But he alludes to the threat pronounced by the Socialist deputy Ángel Galarza ("Do these words not imply an incitement, as cowardly as effective, to the commission of a very serious crime? Does this fact not imply any responsibility for the groups and parties that did not disavow these words?"), to Casares Quiroga's statement on the belligerence of the government over fascism ("When from the head of the blue bench it is said that the Government is belligerent, who can prevent the agents of authority from reaching at some point to the very edges of crime?") and to his alleged threat to Calvo Sotelo on June 16 ("it is equivalent to pointing out, to announcing an "a priori" responsibility, without discerning whether or not he has incurred in it"), so that in the political and moral order he does hold the Government responsible for what happened and, what is even more serious, accuses it of sponsoring violence:

In another passage of his speech he had implicitly justified the uprising that was being prepared:

According to Ranzato, in the face of the formidable challenge that the right wing had just made, "the response of the government and the parties that supported it was inadequate, dilatory and inconsistent. It would have been necessary the intervention of a head of government capable of refuting point by point, of expressing indignation for the assassination of one of the highest representatives of the opposition and of solemnly promising the rapid punishment of the perpetrators, but, at the same time, of denouncing the attempt of the right wing to take advantage of this crime to incite, in turn, to violence and rebellion". But the president of the government, Casares Quiroga, had not attended the meeting of the Permanent Deputation ("it was a very serious political error, and had the effect of seeming to give some reason to those who accused him of complicity in the assassination of the royalist leader", says Ian Gibson), and on behalf of the government the Minister of State Augusto Barcia answered Gil-Robles, "minimizing, evading and at times opposing him with a clumsy defense", according to Ranzato. Answering with "dignity and restraint", according to Ian Gibson. "A vacuous speech", according to Alfonso Bullón de Mendoza. After reproaching Gil-Robles for having expressed himself in "truly monstrous" terms, Barcia resorted to the argument, used on innumerable occasions by the left, of holding the center-right governments of the previous biennium, one of whose most prominent figures had been the leader of the CEDA, ultimately responsible for the disorders. He then defended the actions of the Government in the clarification of the assassination of Calvo Sotelo, alleging that it had taken "absolutely all the measures it could and had in its hands, and they have been taken, and immediately look for the Judge of maximum guarantee and of maximum hierarchy so that, entering in depth, without stopping at anything, going as far as it has to go, to clarify everything". The Minister of the Interior, Juan Moles, also intervened briefly, who instead of "clarifying at least all the aspects relating to the role played —before, during and after the events— by the police forces", limited himself to saying that several members of the Assault Guard had been arrested and separated from service, without giving further details. He added the falsehood ("a reflection that had neither head nor tail", according to Alfonso Bullón de Mendoza) that the two agents guarding Calvo Sotelo's home had put up resistance to those trying to enter the building and that they had "demanded certain guarantees" to allow them to pass. According to Ranzato, the government lost its last chance to "free itself from the ballast of the extreme left that was dragging them to the bottom... by means of a clear separation of responsibilities".

According to Ranzato, neither did the moderate socialist Indalecio Prieto take the opportunity to dissociate himself from the extreme left, perhaps embarrassed by the fact that those who had committed the assassination of Calvo Sotelo were not exalted largocaballerists, but men of his bodyguard. According to Alfonso Bullón de Mendoza, Prieto "lost a wonderful opportunity to keep quiet" because his speech was an extreme example of "cynicism", since, according to this historian, from the very day of the assassination Prieto already knew who had assassinated Calvo Sotelo and was covering up for them. Addressing Gil-Robles, Prieto again resorted to the argument of the left that the violence of that moment was the consequence of "the enormous ferocities committed on the occasion of the repression of the events of October 1934": "You did not calculate then that you had sown a plant whose poison would also reach you. None of us has approved of the events that are now taking place, we condemn and deplore them... but... your honor has no right to believe your hands are totally clean and clean of responsibility while you strive to muddy those of others". Prieto argued as follows:

The truth is that Prieto, who in recent months had been one of the few leaders of the left who had denounced the violence of his co-religionists, had changed his discourse since the beginning of July (perhaps because "he saw the war inexorably coming," according to Ranzato). On July 2 the Executive Committee of the PSOE, which Prieto controlled, had declared that "if we are invited to violent combats, violence will be our system. Tomorrow when the situation arises, our voice will be raised to ask the proletariat to go to war." On July 9 Prieto had published in his newspaper El Liberal in Bilbao an article in which he appealed to "co-religionists and friends" to "live cautiously" and "be alert" "in case the moment comes" to use "our force". He also addressed the Government: "One good forewit is worth two afterwits and a forearmed Government is worth forty" (Spanish: Hombre prevenido vale por dos y el Gobierno prevenido vale por cuarenta). Three days later, on July 12, the eve of Calvo Sotelo's assassination, he had reiterated, again in El Liberal: "Be sure that in launching themselves ['those who from the adversary camp prepare the attack'] they are risking everything, absolutely everything. Just as we must get used to the idea that after our defeat we will be given no quarter. The contest, then, if it finally arises, will have to take place in conditions of extreme harshness".

Gil/Robles' reply to Prieto was forceful: "Mr. Prieto said that the responsibilities of each one had to be measured. I want everything to be discussed here, so that the responsibilities of your honor and of all those who prepared the revolutionary movement and unleashed the catastrophe on the Republic, on Asturias, so that the tremendous cruelties that took place in the revolution are made clear...".

José Díaz, General Secretary of the Communist Party of Spain, after recalling once again the "repression of Asturias", in which "with the consent of the Government, Moorish troops were taken to that region to put Spanish miners through the edge of their gumias", issues a warning to Gil-Robles regarding his alleged involvement in the plot to end the Republic: "Be careful! We are all vigilant so that you cannot carry out your attempts...". On the other hand, he accuses the Government of lukewarmness by "falling short, by not getting to the bottom of the elements responsible for the civil war in Spain", among which he points directly to the CEDA. He ended by addressing the right wing deputies: "Here we are, the workers' forces in the first place, to support the Government, and then to prevent your attempts to lead Spain to catastrophe from succeeding".

The following speaker was the centrist Manuel Portela Valladares who, according to Luis Romero, "is perhaps the only speaker who remains neutral". He stated that he would not support the extension of the state of alarm because, having declared himself a belligerent, the Government would not be able to apply it "with serenity, with moderation, without passion, with equality". For his part, the Lliga deputy Joan Ventosa launched an "unmerciful, although realistic" attack against the President of the Government Casares Quiroga whom he considered the least suitable person "to reestablish civil coexistence among the Spanish and to put an end to the existing civil war". Like the monarchists and Gil-Robles, he also recalls "the [parliamentary] tumults produced by elements that form part of the government minority, from which insults, slander, attacks and incitements to personal attacks have constantly come from". And he underlines that the attack against Calvo Sotelo has no comparison with others because it is "the representative of a force of opinion in conflict with the one in the Government, who is assassinated by those who appear as agents of this Government". Ventonsa ended by saying that he would not support the extension of the state of alarm. José María Cid, of the Spanish Agrarian Party, then intervened, recalling the threat made in Parliament against Calvo Sotelo by the Socialist deputy Ángel Galarza (a threat which had also been alluded to, without naming the deputy, in the declaration of the monarchists). Finally the vote was taken on the extension of the state of alarm, which was approved by thirteen votes against five and one abstention (that of Portela Valladares). As soon as the session was adjourned Gil-Robles, as other prominent members of the right wing had already done or were about to do, left Madrid. He returned by car to Biarritz from where he had come as soon as he learned of the assassination of Calvo Sotelo.

That same day in the afternoon, the socialist caballerist newspaper Claridad responded to Gil-Robles' affirmation, in threatening and ironic tones, that the state of alarm had not served to put an end to violence: "If the state of alarm cannot subdue the right wing, let a dictatorship of the Popular Front come as soon as possible. This is the logical and historical consequence of Mr. Gil-Robles' speech. Dictatorship for dictatorship, the left wing dictatorship. You don't want this government? Then replace it with a dictatorial government of the left. You don't want a state of alarm? Then grant the Cortes full powers. You don't want civil peace? Then let there be a full-scale civil war. You don't want Parliament? Then govern without Parliament. Anything but a return of the right wing. October was their last card and they will not play any more". The article conveyed the confidence of the Socialists of all tendencies, and the working class left in general, that the "proletariat" would be capable of winning in a foreseeable civil war which they estimated to be short-lived.

Consequences

Impact on the military 
The assassination of Calvo Sotelo provoked the last indecisive or indifferent military men to join the rebellion, giving it the definitive impetus. Among the military already committed to the conspiracy, the assassination and its circumstances so excited the spirits that General Mola had to travel on the 14th from Pamplona to Logroño to prevent the clandestine Spanish Military Union (UME) from revolting, together with Phalanx, on the 16th. In addition, several military men even prepared a plot to kidnap the President of the Republic Manuel Azaña, which was finally discarded due to the imminence of the uprising.

Eduardo González Calleja has pointed out that "the assassination did not provoke the military uprising, but it increased the determination of the conspirators and encouraged those who still hesitated to participate in the uprising that was being prepared to take the step". This analysis is shared by other historians, such as José Luis Rodríguez Jiménez who affirms that "the attack was in no way decisive for the preparations for the coup that was about to break out, but it deepened the existing rift in political life, wrapped in a tension already very difficult to dissimulate. Joan Maria Thomàs, for his part, affirms that the assassination of Calvo Sotelo was "decisive in arousing greater support among the generals and officers for the coup and, above all, in arousing support for it among sectors of the population". It also induced the passivity of democratically oriented military personnel when it came to defending the Republic. Luis Romero states: "On July 13, the conspiracy is well advanced, on the verge of exploding the rebel movement, but the shock produced by the death of Calvo Sotelo has a definite influence in the final setting of the date, in deciding the hesitant and subsequent events". Ian Gibson considers that the assassination "gave the rebels —whose conspiratorial plans were already well advanced on July 13— a new and unbeatable justification for the Movement in the eyes of world opinion. It convinced the still hesitant military that the time had come to take sharp decisions." Republican military officer Jesús Pérez Salas wrote in his memoirs about the impact of Calvo Sotelo's assassination on the Army as follows:

The American historian Stanley G. Payne attaches even more importance to the assassination of Calvo Sotelo because he considers that this assassination, which according to him meant "the end of the constitutional system" of the republic, was what led the military to revolt. The assassination of Calvo Sotelo was the catalyst necessary to transform a loose conspiracy into a violent rebellion that could trigger a massive struggle," affirms Payne. Alfonso Bullón de Mendoza supports the same thesis, since he considers that the military conspiracy "had begun its steps several months before... but in hesitant steps, taken in good measure by people who only wanted a pretext for not rising up. However, after learning of the assassination of Calvo Sotelo and its circumstances, "many military men then decided to join the uprising, to the point that it is quite possible that without the assassination of Calvo Sotelo the uprising, which in any case would have broken out in a few days, would have turned into a new Sanjurjada".

Both Payne and Bullón de Mendoza provide as evidence General Franco's change of attitude ("the limit situation of which he had always spoken as the only factor that could justify an armed rebellion had finally come about.... The moment had come when the cautious general had decided that it was even more dangerous not to rebel than to rebel," Payne states). Both recall that only a day before the assassination he had again expressed his doubts about participating in the uprising. Bullón de Mendoza states that "Franco, whose prestige in the Army is difficult to exaggerate, was certainly not an enthusiastic conspirator, and moreover he thought that Mola's preparations were rather shoddy, which is why, like many other military men, he had serious doubts about the chances of success of the coup that was being prepared." For that reason on July 12 Franco sent a message to Mola, through Colonel Valentín Galarza, in which he told him "not very extensive geography", "which meant nothing other than the need to postpone the coup until it was properly prepared", according to Bullón de Mendoza. General Franco's message caused enormous consternation in General Mola, who had to change some instructions and even considered sending General Sanjurjo to Morocco, so that he would be the one to lead the rebellion in the Protectorate. But after learning of the assassination of Calvo Sotelo and its circumstances, General Franco's position took a radical turn. On July 14, the day after the assassination, he informed Mola of his participation in the uprising. According to his cousin and aide Francisco Franco Salgado-Araujo, Franco stated "with great indignation" "that it was no longer possible to wait any longer and that he completely lost hope that the government would change its behavior in carrying out this crime of State, treacherously assassinating a deputy of the nation using the force of public order at its service". Luis Romero comments: "If the attack [against Calvo Sotelo] had not taken place, we do not know how Franco would have reacted if Mola decided to revolt and Sanjurjo moved to Morocco; he would probably have joined the movement. The fact that the Dragon Rapide was in flight does not mean that Franco had made up his mind".

Hugh Thomas had already argued a position similar to Payne's and Bullón de Mendoza's in his history of the civil war published in 1961 and revised in 1976: "Although the conspiracy had been brewing for so long, it was the death of Calvo Sotelo that really decided the conspirators to set it in motion; otherwise they might not have had the courage to take the first step. Now, on the other hand, if they had not acted, they might have been overwhelmed by his followers".

On the other hand, the shock caused by the news of the assassination of Calvo Sotelo also inclined the Carlists to definitely join the uprising led by General Mola, with whom they had been negotiating for several weeks without reaching an agreement. On the night of Wednesday the 15th, the Supreme Carlist Military Assembly of Saint Jean de Luz officially authorized the participation of Carlism in the military movement: "the Traditionalist Communion joins, with all its forces, in all of Spain to the Military Movement for the Salvation of the Homeland".

Beginning of the uprising 

Finally, all obeyed Mola's order that the rebellion should begin on Friday, July 17 in the Spanish Protectorate in Morocco (once the news was known that the forces in Africa would be ready as of July 16) and in a staggered manner between Saturday, July 18 and Monday, July 20 in the peninsula —unlike the proclamation in which all the garrisons rose up at a specific day and time, Mola gave freedom to each square to rise up when it considered it appropriate with the intention of provoking a domino effect; the only date and time he fixed was that of the uprising in the protectorate: the 17th at 17:00—. This was communicated on the 15th by General Mola to his liaison in Madrid, Lieutenant Colonel Valentín Galarza, "The Technician". The day before, the Dragon Rapide plane that was to transfer General Franco from the Canary Islands to the Protectorate of Morocco had landed at the Gando aerodrome (Gran Canaria) (it had not landed in Tenerife, where Franco was, because it did not have a suitable airport; Franco had to look for a pretext to travel there and he found it in the need to attend the funeral of General Amado Balmes who had just died due to an accident while handling a gun). At a quarter past seven in the morning of Friday, July 17, a liaison of General Mola sent from Bayonne three coded radiotelegrams to General Franco in Tenerife, to General Sanjurjo in Lisbon and to Lieutenant Colonel Juan Seguí Almuzara in Melilla in which they were reminded of the order to begin the uprising on the 17th at 17:00. However, according to Luis Romero the date that appeared on the radiograms was Saturday, July 18, and the uprising was brought forward in the Protectorate of Morocco to Friday afternoon, July 17, because the conspirators in Melilla were forced to do so to avoid being arrested when they were gathered in the offices of the Boundary Commission located in the Alcazaba.

Some conservative leaders who had not participated in the conspiracy were warned of the date of the coup and were advised to leave Madrid (or Barcelona, as in the case of Francesc Cambó). Alejandro Lerroux, for example, went to Portugal and from there gave his support to the coup. The one who decided to stay was Melquiades Álvarez who would die murdered in the sacking of the Model Prison of Madrid on August 22, 1936. The right wing leaders who were committed to the uprising had begun to leave the capital after attending the funeral of Calvo Sotelo on the afternoon of Tuesday, July 14, or after the meeting of the Permanent Deputation which was held on the morning of the following day. José María Gil-Robles left by car to Biarritz that same afternoon of the 15th; Antonio Goicoechea left on Friday 17th to a farm in the province of Salamanca near the border with Portugal. Also leaving Madrid that same Friday 17th were Calvo Sotelo's wife and children. Early in the evening they took the Lisbon express. Threatening graffiti had appeared in the capital, such as one that read "the descendants of Calvo Sotelo, will follow the same path as their father". They arrived in Lisbon on the morning of Saturday the 18th and at the Estación del Rocío, "crowded with people" —as Calvo Sotelo's daughter Enriqueta recalled— General Sanjurjo was waiting for them, who offered his arm to the widow to leave the station. It seems that the general told her: "We have lost the most illustrious man in Spain". Calvo Sotelo's family would leave Lisbon to settle in the rebel zone in September 1937.

Assessment 
The Italian historian Gabriele Ranzato has pointed out that what the assassination of Calvo Sotelo revealed was that "the State of the Popular Front, instead of limiting itself to pursuing and striking down with the law the instigators, promoters and executors of subversive violence, using all its legal repressive resources, had, on the other hand, allowed summary justice —or rather summary vengeance—, and moreover against one of the most eminent figures of the opposition, by members of its forces of order, without, on the other hand, taking immediate and severe measures against them. This had led to an obfuscation of the rule of law, capable of engendering great insecurity in many disconcerted citizens...".

Joan Maria Thomàs agrees with Ranzato when he states that "the most important thing was the government's lack of reaction to the assassination of the ultra-right winger and congressman, which did not act energetically to reestablish order and disappointed those sectors that were clamoring for a change of direction.

A similar assessment is made by Alfonso Bullón de Mendoza, but he goes further by arguing that the Government could have avoided the civil war with a forceful action. "Although there are many sources of the time that point to the assassination of Calvo Sotelo as the point of no return towards civil war, we believe that the conflict could still have been avoided. Everything depended on the attitude taken by the Government, because if it reacted with unprecedented forcefulness to the unprecedented fact that a National Deputy was assassinated with the collaboration of the State Security Forces, it is quite possible that it would have managed to convince a large sector of Spanish society (conspirators included) that order was finally going to be reestablished. Bullón de Mendoza also states that "had it not been for the impact of his death, it is quite possible that [the National Uprising] would not have been, as the Government supposed, a new 'sanjurjada'".

In 1965 the American historian Gabriel Jackson already pointed out that "for anyone who was not a blind supporter of the left it was intolerable that a leader of the opposition should be assassinated by uniformed officers driving a Government vehicle", although he added that "it was equally intolerable that the Phalanx and the UME should conduct with impunity a campaign of terror against leftist officers". In this way he equated the murders of Lieutenant del Castillo and Calvo Sotelo which he said both "horrified public opinion much more than any of the numerous disorders and occasional deaths since February".

Stanley G. Payne has highlighted the fact that "never before in the history of Western parliamentary regimes had a detachment of the State Police joined with revolutionary criminals to kidnap and assassinate an opposition leader. But the comparison no longer fit in reality, because the Second Republic was no longer a constitutional parliamentary system".

For his part Julius Ruiz has pointed out the similarities that the assassination of Calvo Sotelo presents with the "Red Terror" that was unleashed in the Republican zone during the first months of the Spanish Civil War, in which he coincides to a large extent with what Payne has pointed out. "His assassination was a precedent for the later terror in several fundamental respects. First, it was carried out by a brigade with a mixture of police and militia.... Condés invoked his authority to convince the politician to accompany the assassins in the dead of night. This modus operandi would be used on countless occasions during the following four months. Secondly, Calvo Sotelo was a victim of gangsterism: he was taken for a "ride" in the back seat of a police van and his body was disposed of in the city cemetery. Thirdly, the Socialist leaders provided political protection to the perpetrators of the assassination."

Legacy during Franco's regime: the mythification of the "protomartyr" 

The rebel side used the assassination of Calvo Sotelo to justify and legitimize the coup d'état of July 1936 and directly accused the government of the Republic of crime. This is what General Franco said on April 19, 1938: "That Regime died definitively that sad dawn in which a seductive Government, acting as the executing arm of Freemasonry, plotted and carried out, through its agents, the vile assassination of the Chief of the parliamentary opposition and great patrician: José Calvo Sotelo". That same year of 1938, the publishing house Ediciones Antisectarias of Burgos had published a pamphlet entitled Por quién fue asesinado Calvo Sotelo (By whom Calvo Sotelo was assassinated), whose author was the journalist of the Catholic newspaper El Debate Benjamín Bentura and whose purpose was to demonstrate the implication of the government of the Popular Front in the assassination. One of the "proofs" provided by Bentura was the alleged meeting that Captain Condés held at one o'clock in the morning of Monday the 13th —two hours before leading the expedition that would end Calvo Sotelo's life— with the President of the Government Casares Quiroga. Condés would have been accompanied by the Assault Lieutenant of the Cavalry Group Máximo Moreno. He relied exclusively on information provided by a commander of the Civil Guard, a friend of his. Ian Gibson underplays the credibility of this story —there is no record of the alleged interview with Casares Quiroga— and yet "the visit of Condés and Moreno to Casares Quiroga became a dogma of Francoist propaganda. Dogma, like any other, unquestionable". As was also considering the assassination of Calvo Sotelo as "a State crime". This was the official doctrine during the forty years of Franco's dictatorship.

In the final months of the civil war, Generalissimo Franco ordered the formation of a Commission on the Illegitimacy of the Powers Acting on July 18, 1936, with the mission of having its members find proof that the Popular Front government against which part of the Army had risen was "illegitimate" in order to give legitimacy to the coup d'état of July 1936. One of the "proofs" adduced by the Commission was that the Government of the Republic was behind the assassins of Calvo Sotelo. To prove it, they provided testimonies whose veracity historians doubt today. As Ian Gibson has pointed out, the members of the Commission "made a special effort to locate people who supported the thesis, or dogma, that the assassination had been "a scandalous State crime". So much so that, in many cases, the statements of these witnesses cannot be considered reliable". The information gathered by the Commission was incorporated in the immediate postwar period into the General Cause. One of the testimonies used by the Commission was that of Andrés Amado, friend and co-religionist of Calvo Sotelo, who wrote a detailed account, "loaded with value judgments" (according to Ian Gibson), of his dealings during the early hours of Monday the 13th. Such was their interest that they asked former Socialist minister during the war Julián Zugazagoitia, who had been arrested in France by the Nazis and handed over to Franco, about the assassination of Calvo Sotelo. Zugazagoitia in his statement of Luis Cuenca said: "I had formed a very bad concept of this individual, as an element of the Party capable of committing assassinations".

The judges of the General Cause also made an enormous effort to obtain testimonies proving the involvement of the Republican government. They obtained only a few, of whose veracity again there are doubts, even more so in this case given the context in which the statements were made since years of imprisonment and even the death penalty were at stake. Luis Romero in his book Por qué y cómo mataron a Calvo Sotelo (Why and how Calvo Sotelo was killed, 1982) wrote: "The statements included in the General Cause must be cautiously valued, in view of the extreme circumstances in which they were made; they contain valuable data. For his part, Ian Gibson, author of La noche en que mataron a Calvo Sotelo (The Night Calvo Sotelo was Killed, 1982), stated that the witnesses were conditioned "probably by the desire to tell the judges what they wanted to hear".

At the end of the war, four of the ten or twelve Assault Guards who were in van No. 17 were detained and interrogated by Francoist judges: the driver Orencio Bayo Cambronero; José del Rey Hernández, who sat in front with Condés; and Aniceto Castro Piñeiro and Bienvenido Pérez Rojo, who rode in the back. However, according to Ian Gibson, the testimony that the Francoist judges took most advantage of —and that "profoundly influenced Francoist historiography about the assassination of Calvo Sotelo" was not that of any of them, but that of the lieutenant of the 9th Security Company Esteban Abellán Llopis, whose veracity Gibson has many doubts about because he was focused on implicating the director general of Security José Alonso Mallol and the Minister of the Interior Juan Moles, which was what the Francoist judges were looking for. Abellán said that the officers of the Assault Guard who went to the Surgical Team where the corpse of Lieutenant Castillo was found "spoke of taking revenge" and that Alonso Mallol, who was also present, did not contradict them, but "remained next to the group of those who were most vociferous, and although he did not speak, it could be seen that he paid attention to what the others were saying". More importance was given to his testimony about the alleged complicity in the assassination of the Minister of the Interior Juan Moles, who had authorized the search of the homes of prominent right wing leaders, although Abellán was not present at the meeting held with him by four officers of the Pontejos Barracks, nor was he at the Ministry of the Interior. What he affirmed was what he had heard some officers say in the General Directorate of Security: "Captain Serna joined Captains Cuevas and Puig [both from the Pontejos Barracks] and they said that a fat person had to be killed, so that it would be a big deal. Immediately after finishing this conversation, Captains Serna and Cuevas left and, when about half an hour had passed, they returned saying that they had been talking personally with the Minister of the Interior, Juan Moles, to whom they had asked permission to take reprisals for the death of Castillo and that the Minister had authorized them to carry out searches in the homes of significant right wing persons". Gibson adds that Abellán's statement contradicts the testimony he collected in his book by Lieutenant Alfredo León Lupión, which he considers much more credible because he was present at the meetings reported by Abellán.

At the same time that the assassination of Calvo Sotelo was used to justify and legitimize the coup d'état of July 1936 and Franco's dictatorship, the mythification of his figure began in the middle of the civil war. The monarchist José Félix de Lequerica wrote on July 11, 1937 in El Ideal Gallego an article entitled "The last afternoon with Calvo Sotelo" in which he narrated the meeting he had with him and other monarchist deputies in a picnic area on the outskirts of Madrid to have tea just a year before, on Saturday afternoon, July 11, 1936 —a day and a half later he would be assassinated—. In the article he said the following:

Twenty-three years later, July 17, 1960, Luis de Galinsoga, director of the monarchist newspaper ABC when he was assassinated, published an article in the same newspaper entitled "Conciencia de mártir en Calvo Sotelo" (Martyr's conscience in Calvo Sotelo). Among other things it said:

Four days earlier, on July 13, 1960 (the twenty-fourth anniversary of the assassination), General Franco inaugurated the Monument to Calvo Sotelo  in the Plaza de Castilla in Madrid. In his speech he said:

Notes

References

Bibliography 

 
 
 
 
 
 
 
 
 
 
 
 
 
 

 
 
 
 
 
 
 
 
 
 
 
 

Spanish Civil War
1936 in Spain
Assassinations in Spain